= Sielanka, Bydgoszcz =

City district, Bydgoszcz, Poland, 1910s-1930s architectural style

Sielanka estate osiedle Sielanka
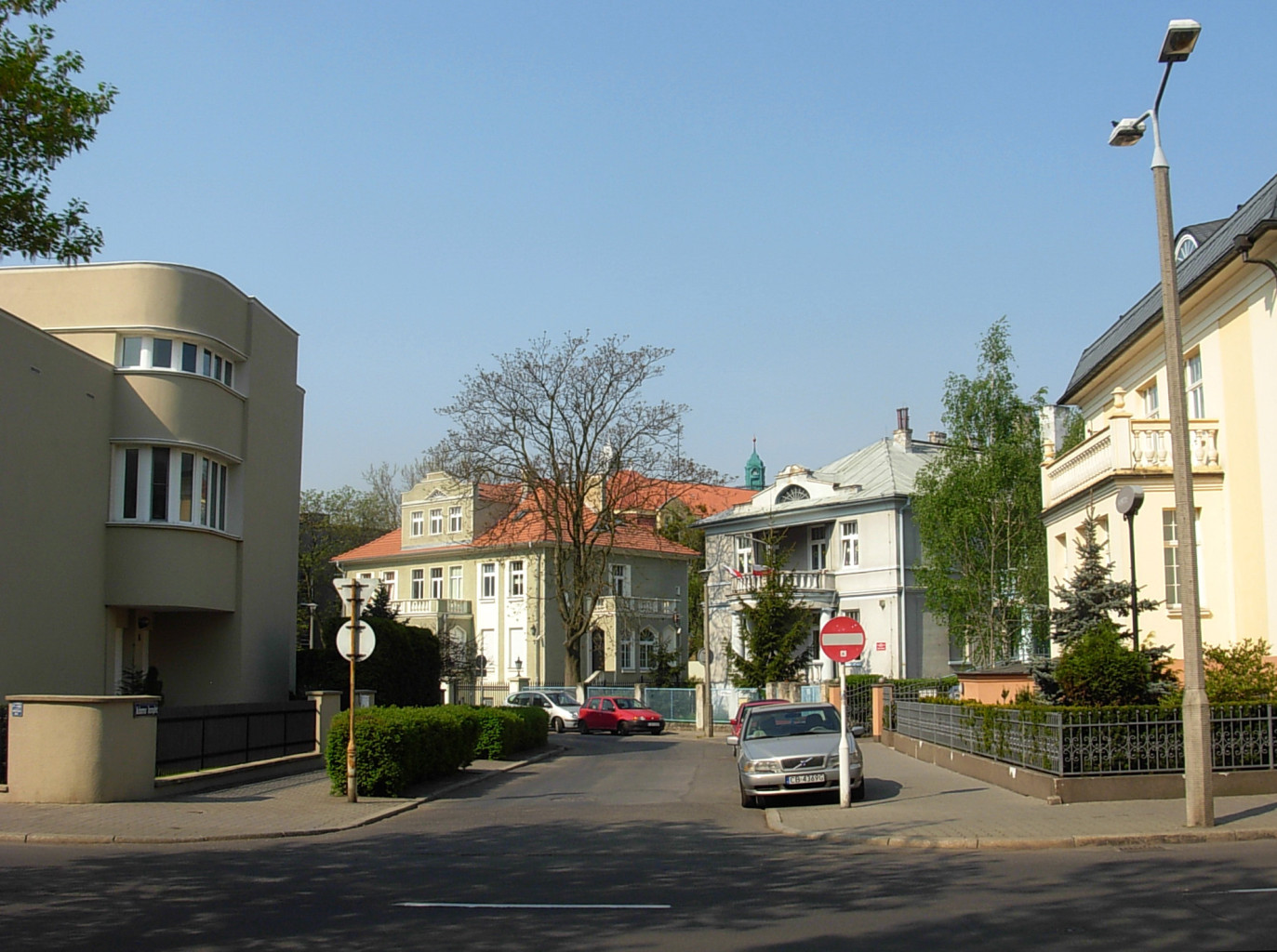
- View of Asnyka Street

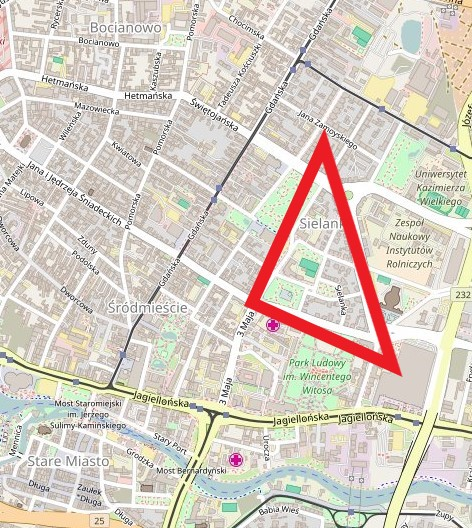
- Estate territory on a map
- Coordinates: 53°07′41″N 18°00′49″E
- City: Bydgoszcz, Poland
- Founded: 1912
- Founder: Heinrich Metzger

Area
  - Total: 10.5 ha (26 acres)

Sielanka is a housing estate developed in the 1910s in the heart of downtown city Bydgoszcz, Poland. Its completion spans almost 25 years, across the political changes of the period (from the Prussian occupation to the re-creation of the Polish state). It was created in the spirit of garden city spirit originating from the beginning of the 20th century and refers to eclectic forms. In addition, there are many modernist villas, fashionable in the interwar period.

== Location ==
Sielanka is part of the Śródmieście (meaning downtown) district of Bydgoszcz. It's roughly triangle-shaped, limited by the following roads:

- Staszica and Paderewskiego Streets;
- Ossoliński Avenue;
- Markwarta street in Bydgoszcz.

The name Sielanka literally translates to Idyll.

== History ==
=== Genesis ===
The garden city movement was embodied by Ebenezer Howard, as this urban trend took off in the second half of the 19th century. The concept of garden city assumed the construction of urban bodies located around a centre harbouring a public recreational green area, with rings of housing estates comprising small plots with single-family houses, the outer rings hosting public utility buildings and further out production plants. Howard's idea was especially described in his book Garden Cities of To-morrow published in 1902. The first garden city was located in England (Letchworth-1903), with examples of such planning soon following suit in Poland: Ząbki near Warsaw (1912), Podkowa Leśna (1925) or Gdynia (1925).

At the beginning of the 20th century, the municipality of the then Prussian Bromberg had a vast area completely undeveloped, located between Braesicke-Schiller straße (Staszica and Paderewskiego st.), Fröner straße (Markwarta st.) and Hohenzollern straße (Ossolińskich Av.).

Despite the 1903 decision to erect the complex of the Institutes of Agriculture in the northern part, the district remained by and large bare from construction. Seeking development, the municipal authorities reached out to the urban engineer Josef Stübben with hopes of developing a concept layout of this city sector.

Stübben (1845–1936) was a German architect, graduated from the Berlin Building Academy, who worked at the Technical Council of the Prussian Ministry of Finance (1904–1920) and had chaired the Poznań expansion commission. At the time, he was a regarded urban developer, having devised many plans for important cities such as Aachen, Düsseldorf, Cologne, Luxembourg City, Madrid, Rostock, Warsaw. Josef Stübben won the first prize in the international competition for the urban planning of the greater Vienna. In Prussian Poland, he also worked in Poznań, Głogów and Wałbrzych.

His sketch, delivered in December 1912, became the blueprint for the project drawn up by Heinrich Metzger, the Bromberg city construction adviser, seconded by engineer Bernhard Hirsch. Following the garden city principles, the scheme planned constructing a green square at its centre and at each corner of the triangular area. Although the core plaza still exists at Turwid square, only one out of three others was achieved (today's square of Leszek Biały).

Metzger and Hirsch worked on the parceling of the land, establishing the size of each of the plots, the regular width of the front gardens, prohibiting the building of any workshops in the backrooms of the villas and dramatically limiting commercial and manufacturing activities within properties. Eventually, around 50 plots were laid down and approved for house construction.

=== Period before WWI ===
In the first Prussian documents, the area was called Gartenstadt (English: garden city); the name Eigenheimviertel (English: Home district) was also used to describe the entire domain. Once the building phase started, the first specific names appear to designate the places:

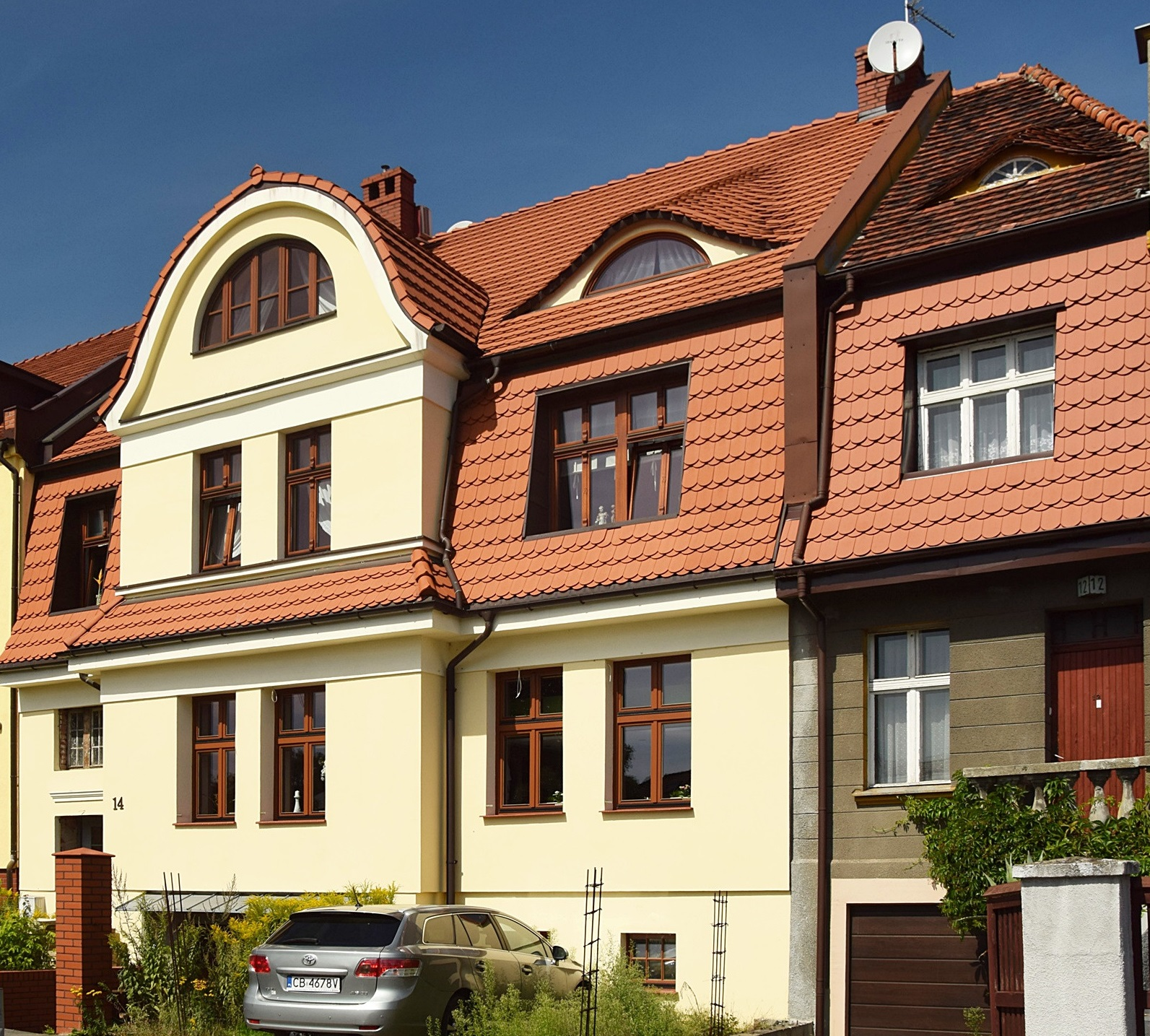
Villa at 14 Sielanka st.

- Eigenheimplatz, renamed Mackensenplatz (today's Turwid square, Sielanka and Wyspiańskiego streets);
- Eigenheimstrasse A, later Hindenburgstrasse (today's Kopernika street);
- Eigenheimstrasse B (today's Asnyka street).

In 1914, the city office began to allocate plots to owners by the means of private selling. The first houses were erected on parcels located on both sides of Turwid square at 4, 6, 8 Wyspiańskiego street and 14 Sielanka street. Another house was also built, albeit with a different interior layout, at 5 Kopernika street.

Villas of this time were characterised by complicated details: numerous turrets, bay windows and intricate roof structures. They generally refer to neoclassical and neo-baroque styles, as part of the historicizing period. At the outset of WWI, only 5 villas have been realised.

=== Construction during interwar period ===
After the end of WWI, there was a ten-year stagnation period associated with the political situation (rebirth of the Polish state) and the low economic activity. The resuming of construction in this part of the district is inextricably linked with the April 29th 1925 Act on the expansion of cities, which imposed an obligation on municipalities to improve the housing situation and created preferential finacncial conditions for the development of villa-type accommodations.

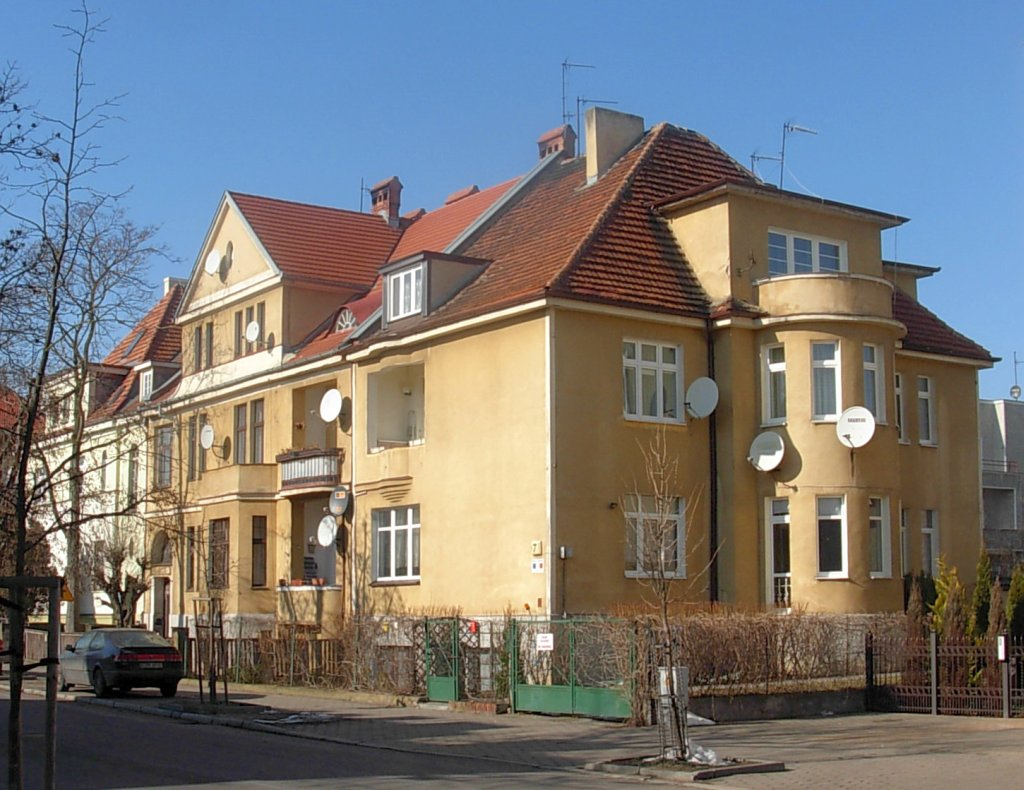
Villa at 5 Kopernika st.

New constructions set off in 1927, with the particular support of architect-engineer Bogdan Raczkowski, who had been appointed in December 1922 as deputy chairman of the urban management committee. Strict regulations were issued for the future buildings. Some of these limitations include:

- villas could be equipped with a maximum of two full floors (i.e. ground floor and first floor) and a Mansard roof;
- future accommodations in the basement would require have a special sanction from the Municipal Office;
- the accommodations must not be used for renting purposes;
- constructing stables was prohibited.

Such constraints allowed buildings to maintain their character, even though the City Development Committee was inclined, when possible, to promote the construction of multi-apartment villas.

During this period, 18 new villas were built from 1927 to 1930, 17 new ones from 1930 to 1933 and 4 more shortly before the outbreak of WWII.

== Main streets and places ==
=== Markwarta street ===
Named after Ryszard Markwart (1868–1906), a Polish priest, who was a nationalist activist and head of the Bromberg parish from 1899 till his death, the street delineates the southern border of Sielanka estate, with most of its northern side features villas dating back to this project.

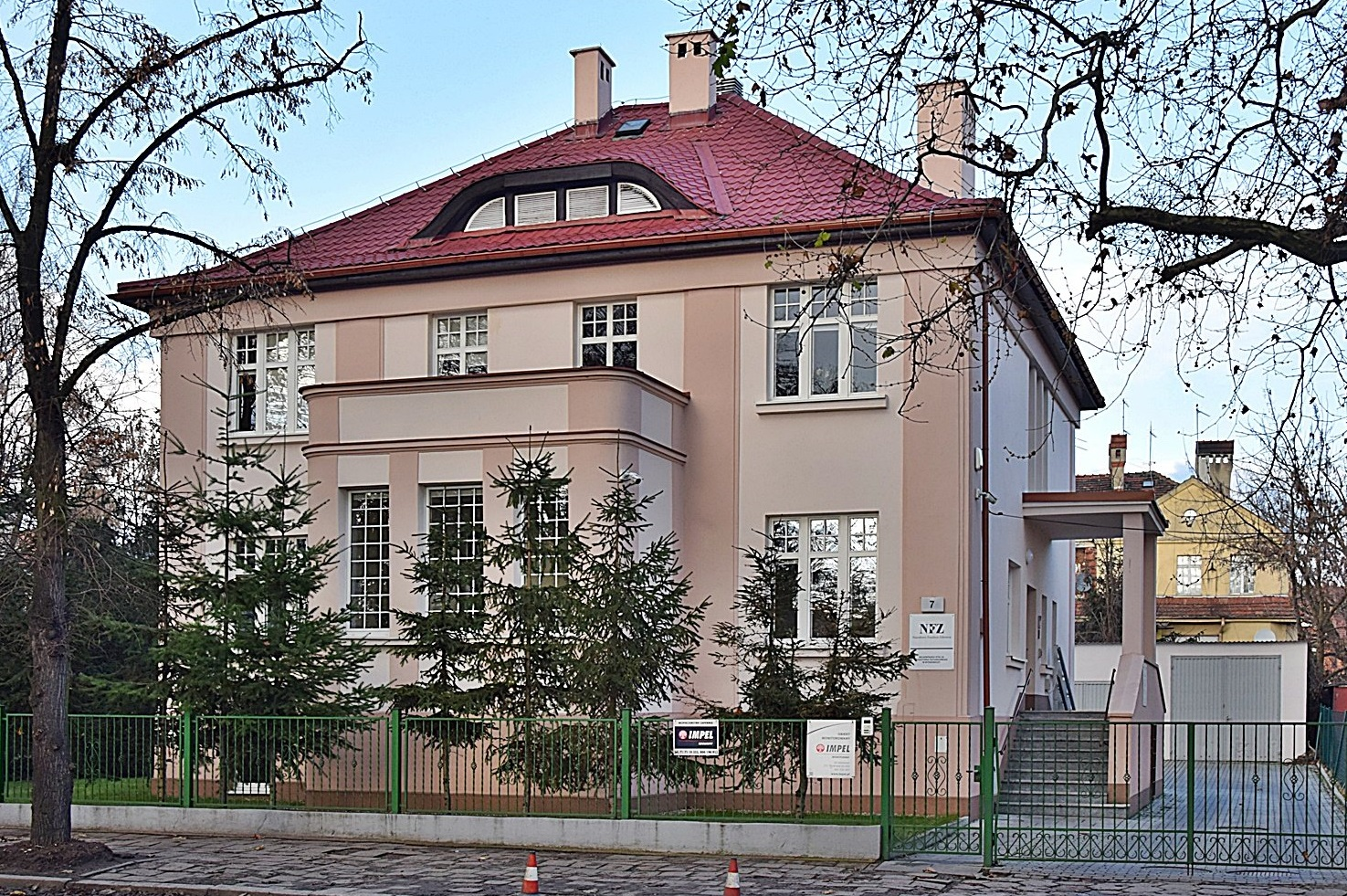
Villa at Nr.7 by Józef Grodzki (1927–1928)

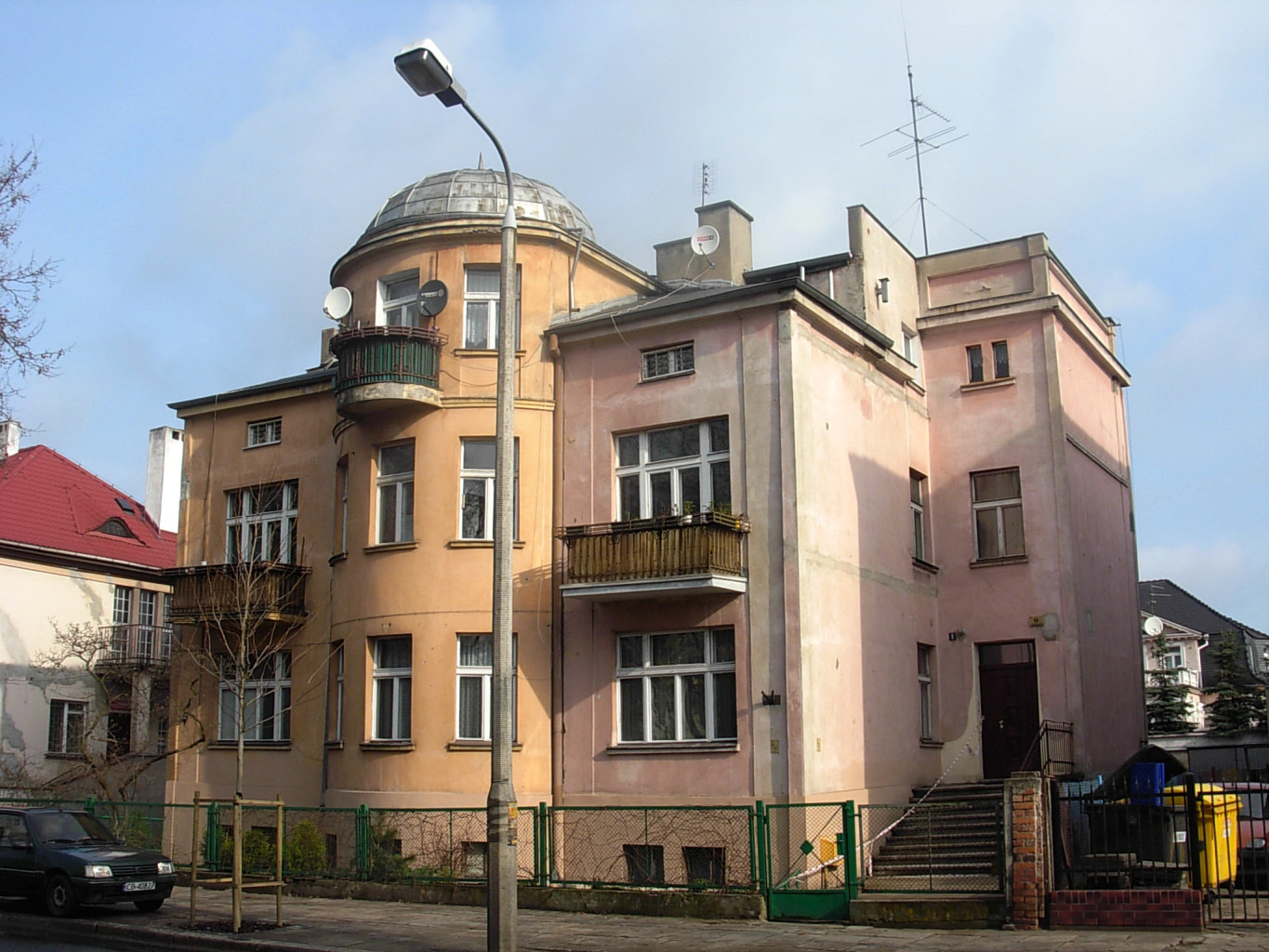
Villa at Nr.9 by Józef Grodzki (1927–1929)

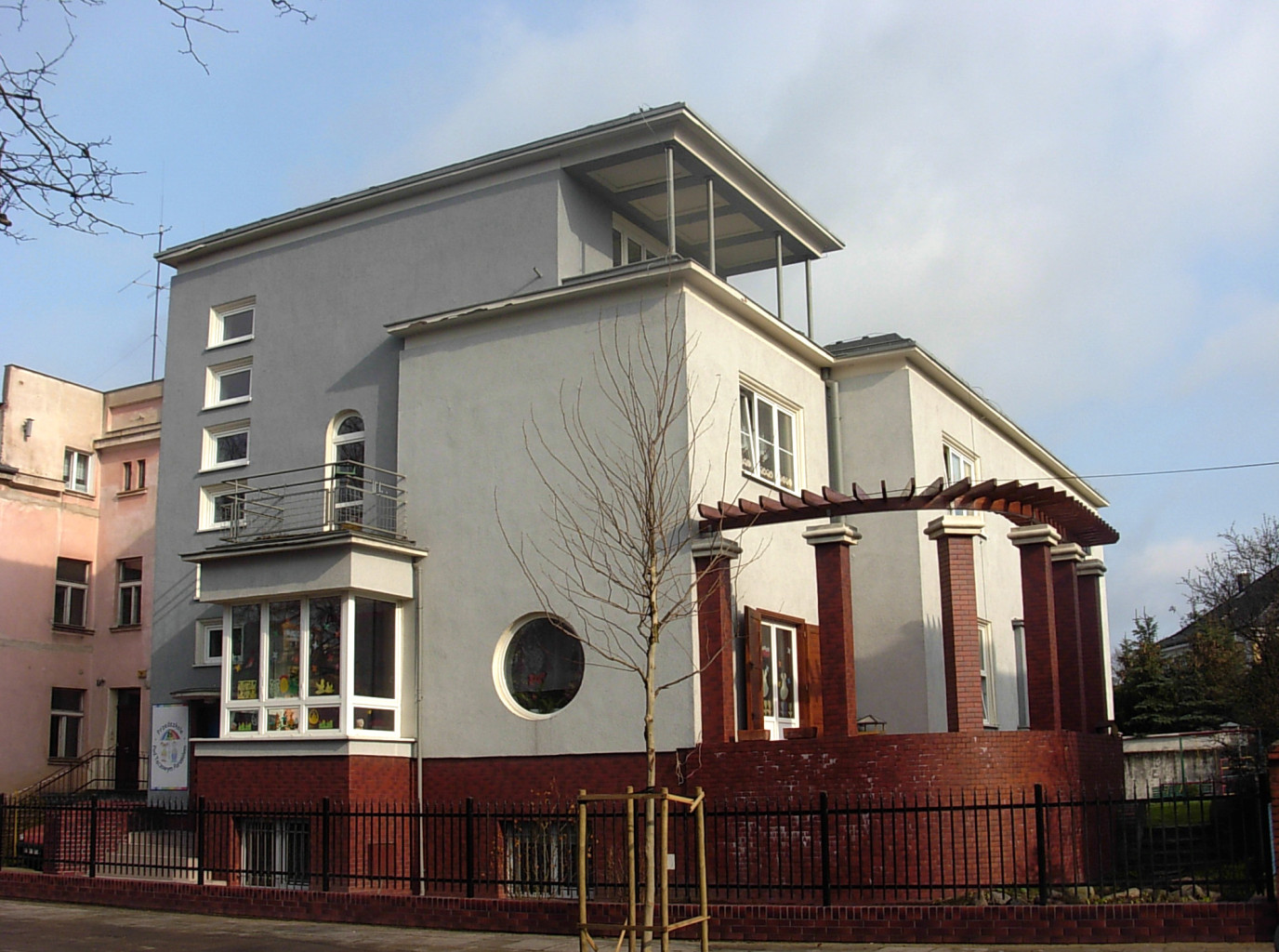
Wacław Millner villa at Nr.11, by Jan Kossowski (1937–1938)

=== Ossoliński avenue ===
Laid out in the early 1900s, it marks out the eastern border of the Sielanka estate. To the east, most of the plots belong to the buildings of the Institute of Agriculture, established in 1903–1906. A significant share of the western frontages display functionalist or Polish National style features.

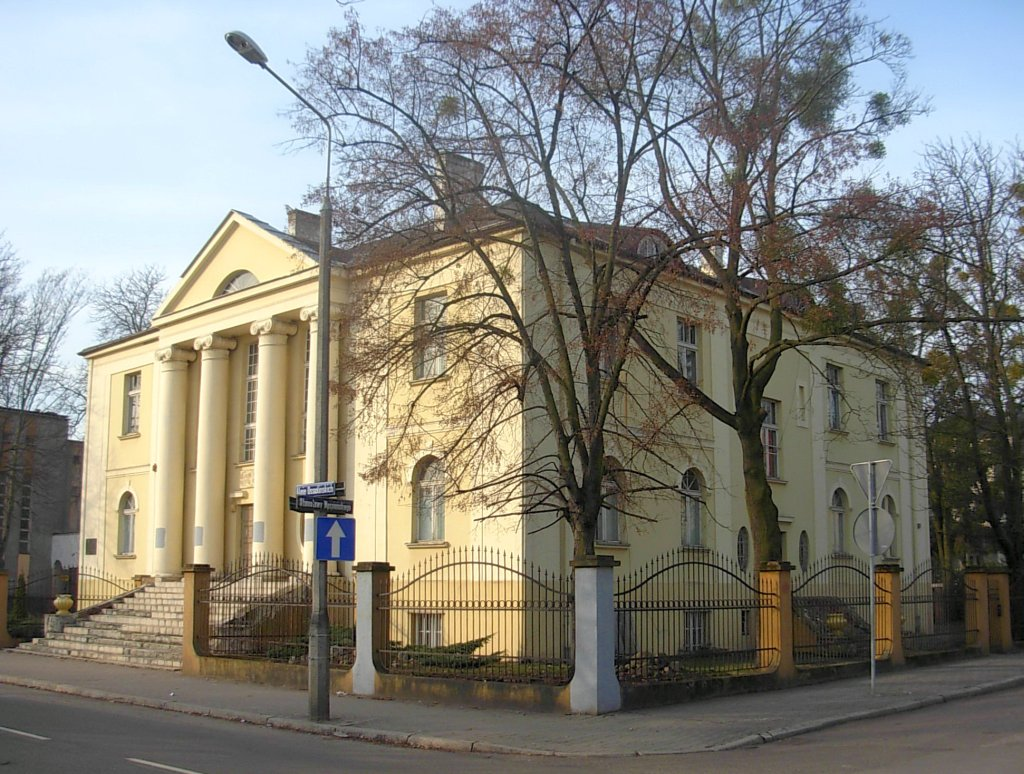
Villa at 7, by Bronisław Jankowski (1927–1929)

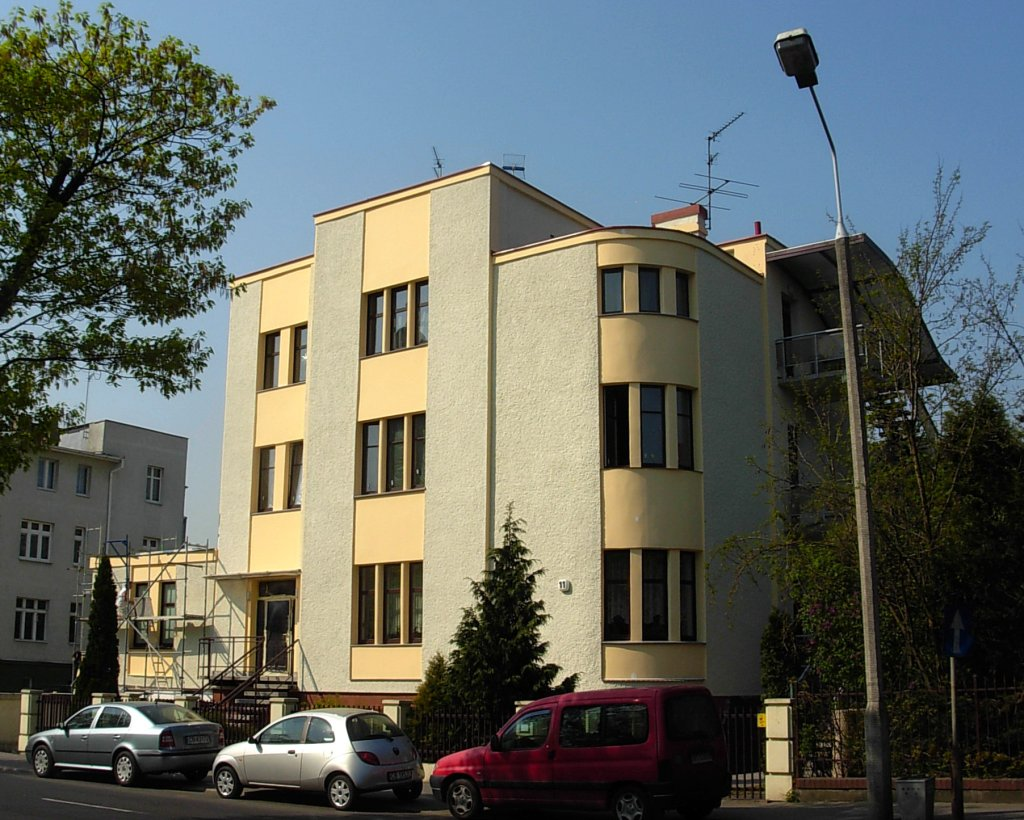
Villa at 11 by Henryk Misterek (1932–1933)

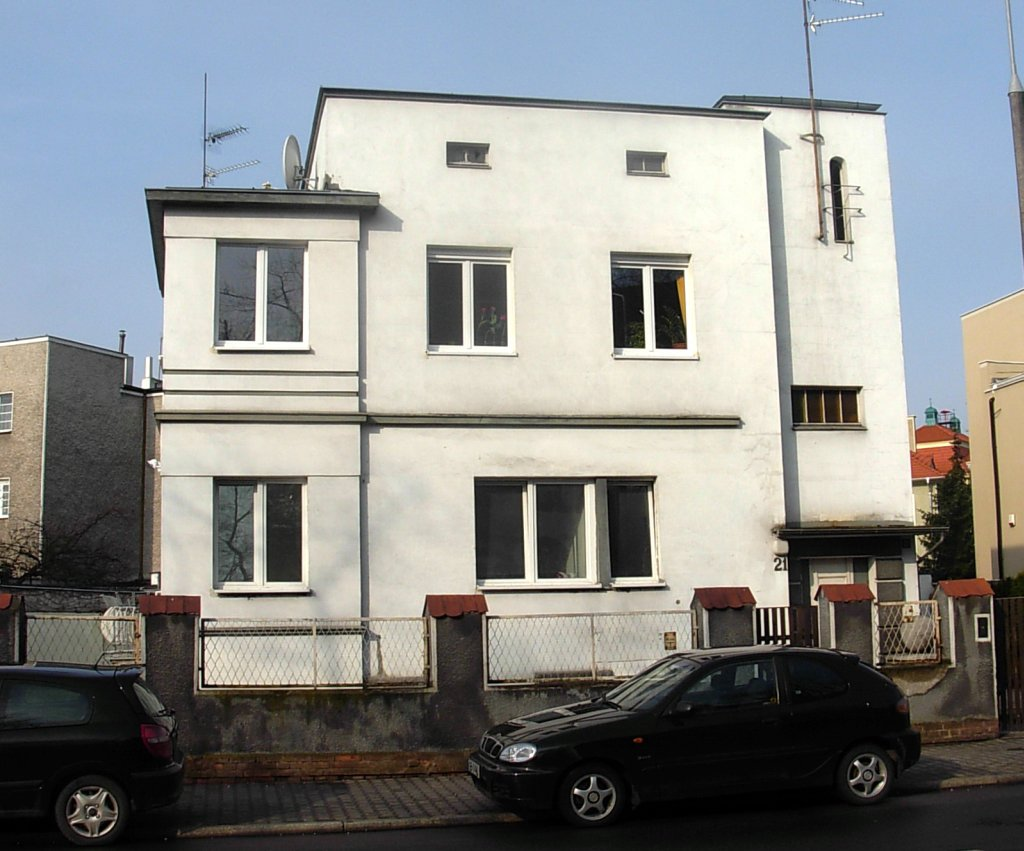
Villa at 21 by Bolesław Polakiewicz (1932–1933)

=== Józef Weyssenhoff Square ===
The plaza is located at the northern tip of Sielanka area. Due to its earlier development, only the southern frontages are related to the project, the others having been erected at the beginning of the 20th century.

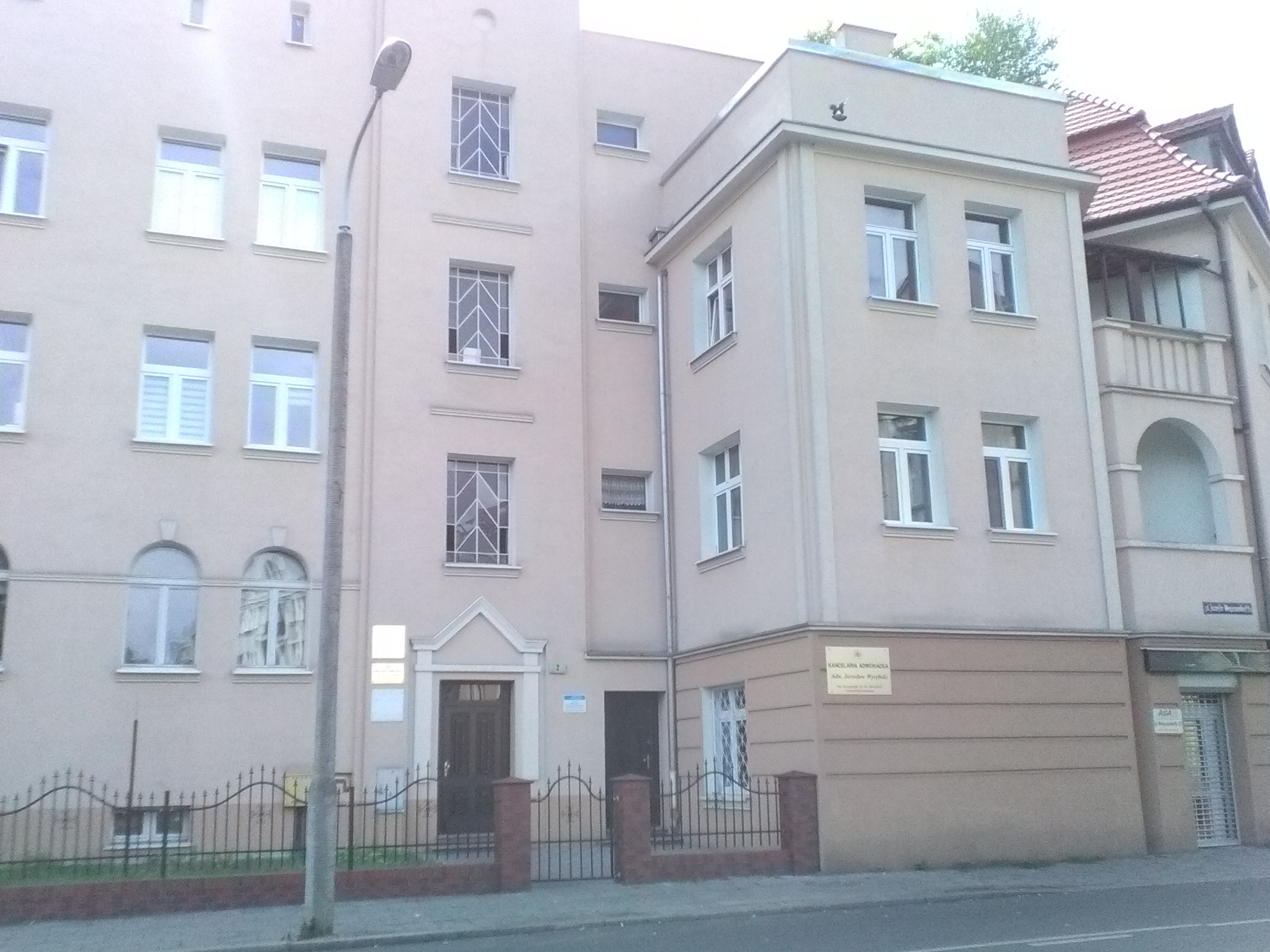
Building at 2, by Bogdan Raczkowski (1927)

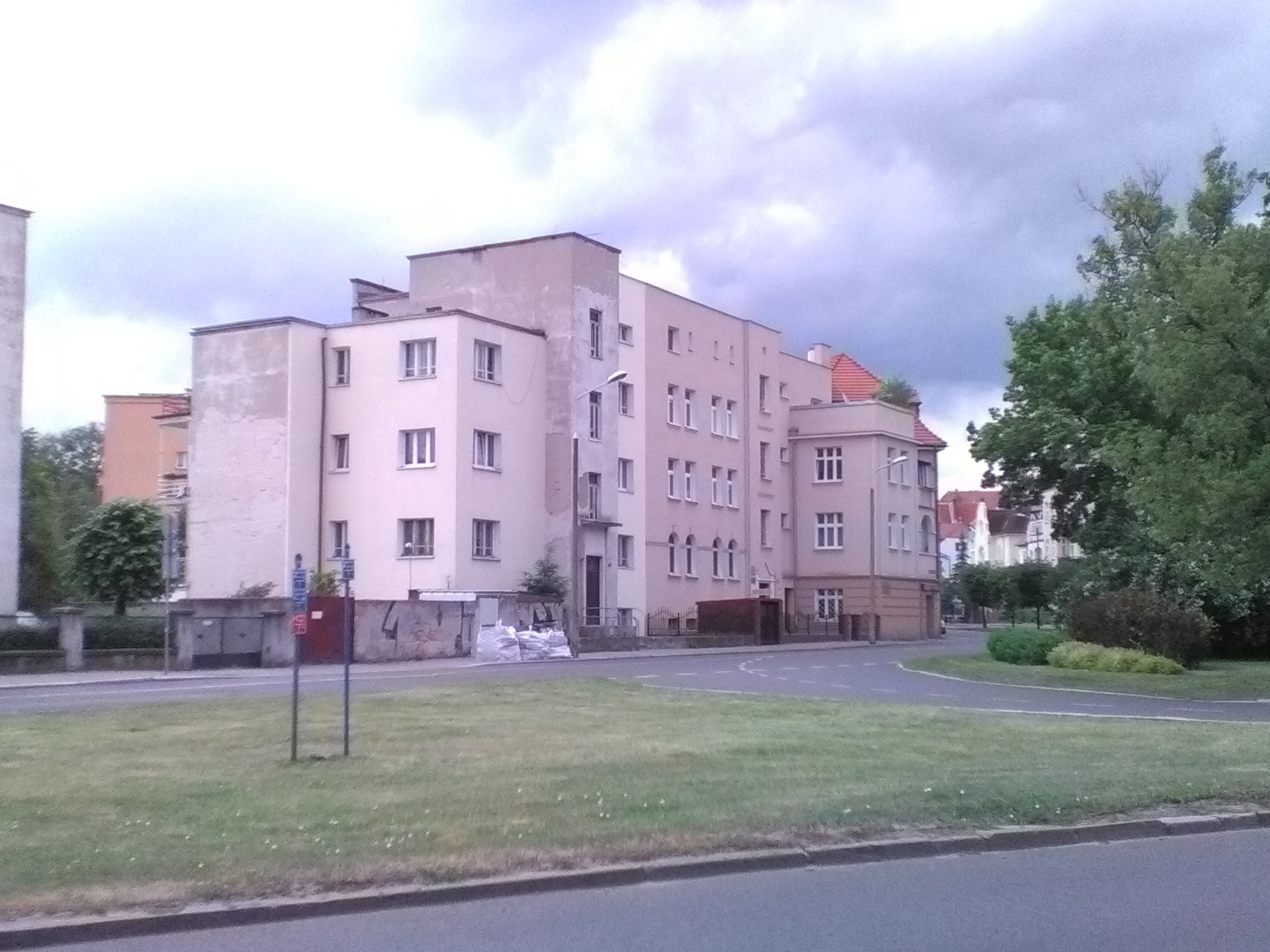
Tenement at 4 by Eugeniusz Wellman (1933)

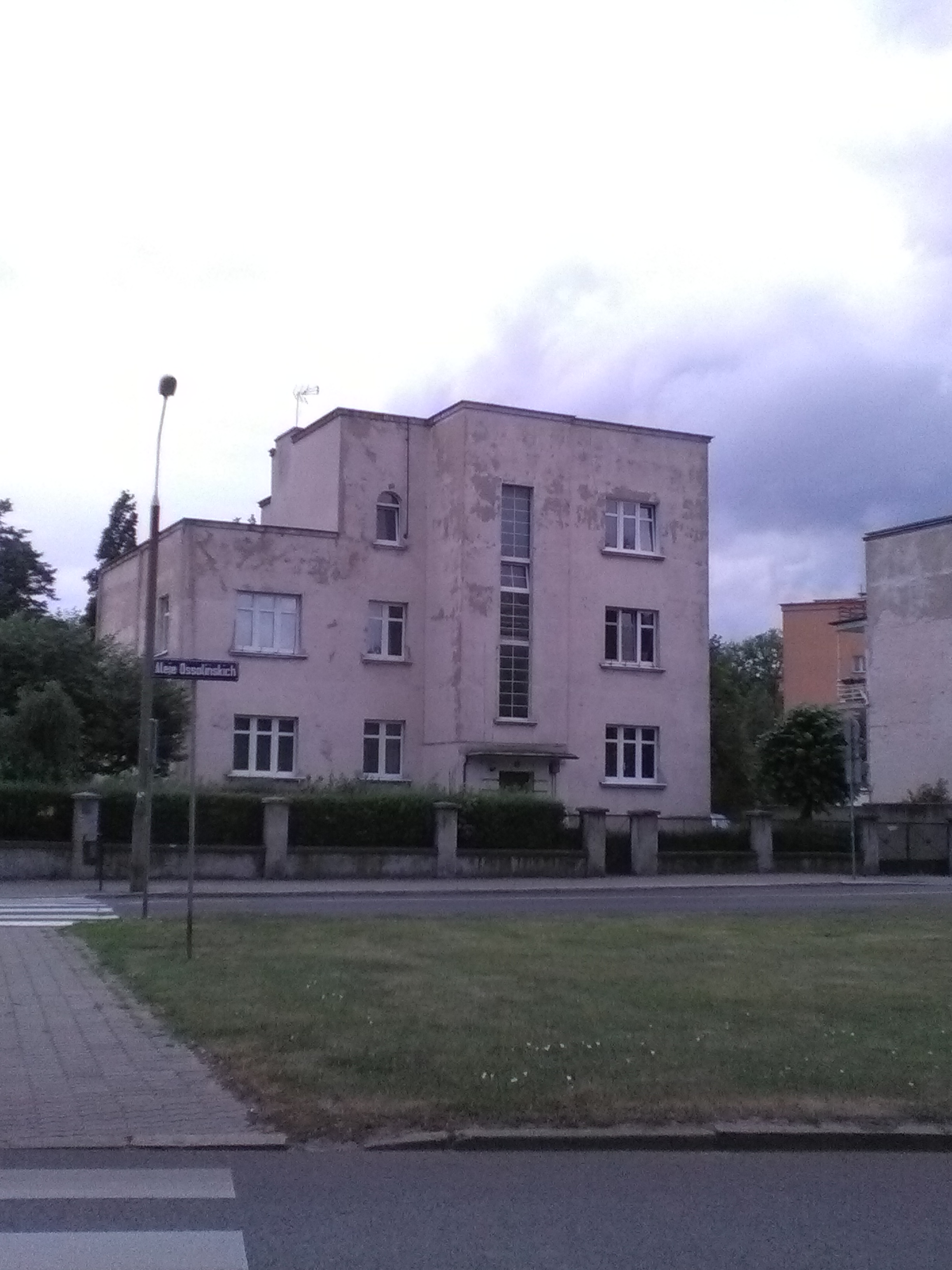
Villa at 6 by Konstanty Dzielinski (1934–1935)

=== Sielanka street ===
Sielanka Street is a small and twisty road, laid in the mid-1910s: consisting of a series of villas, each of which is unique in its architectural concept.

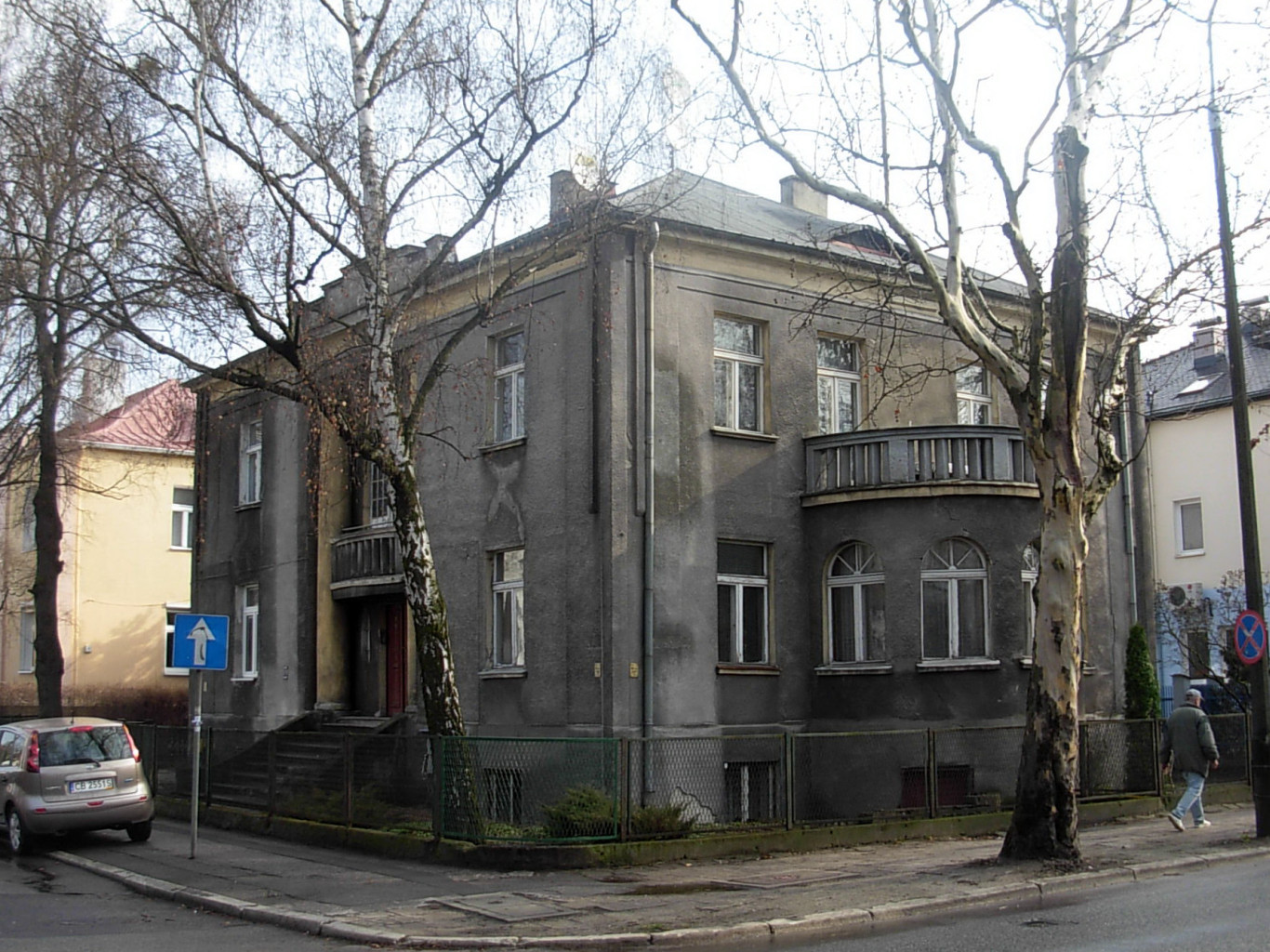
Villa at 2 by Bronisław Jankowski (1927–1928)

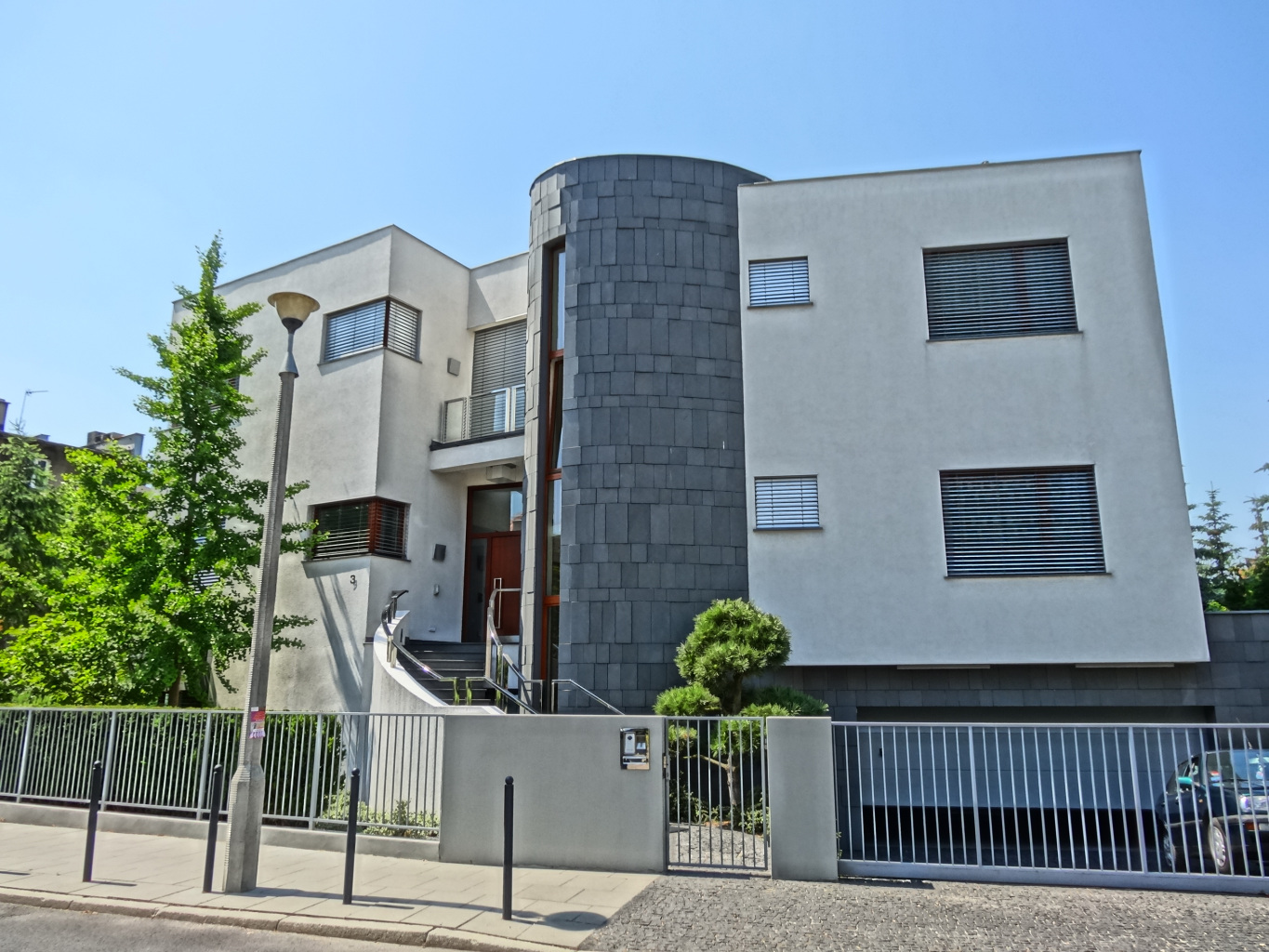
Villa at 3 by Bronisław Jankowski (1934–1935)

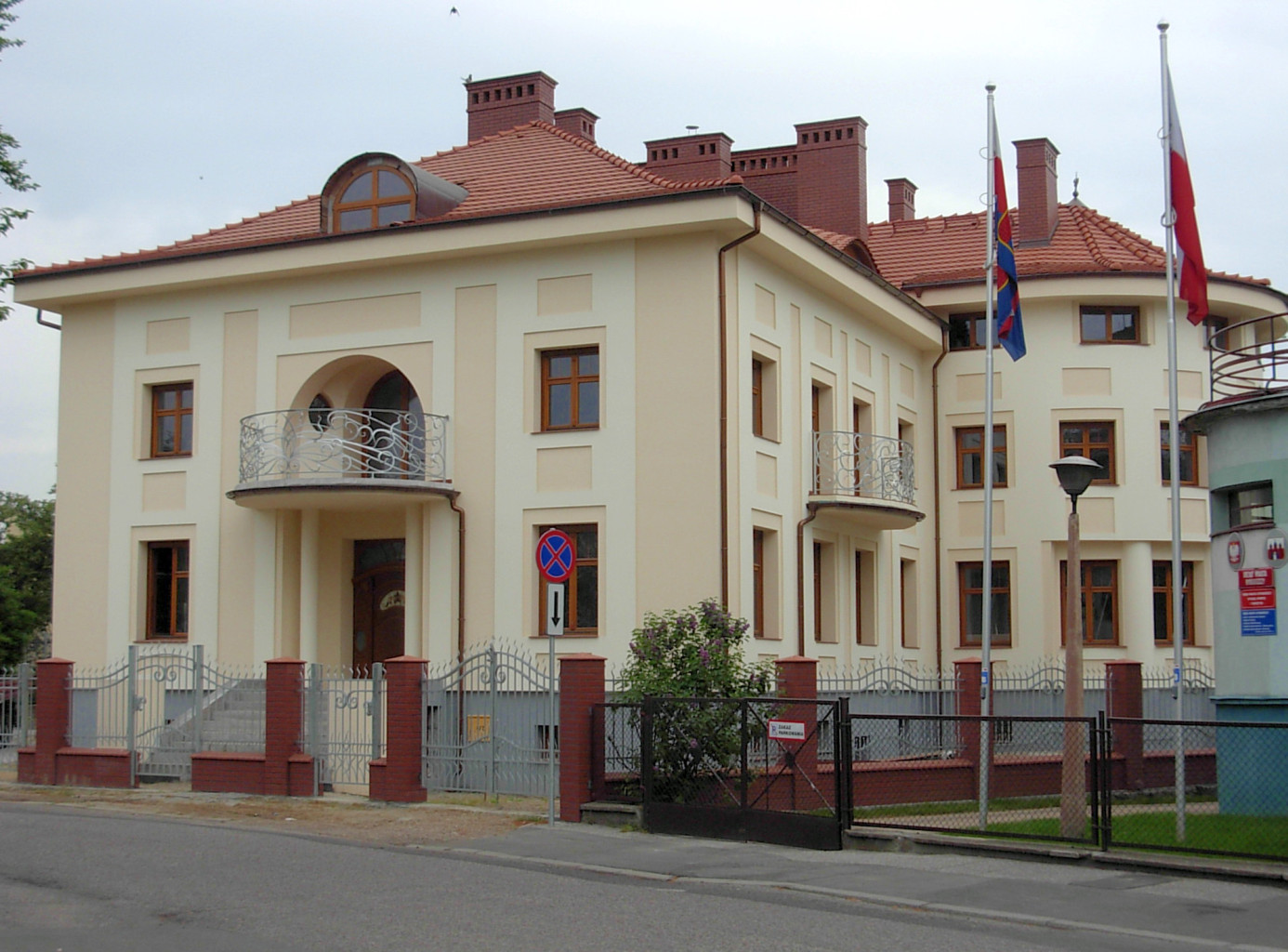
Villa at 10 by Bronisław Jankowski (1927)

=== Kopernika street ===
Short street where several villas are registered on the Kuyavian-Pomeranian Voivodeship Heritage List. The street is named after Nicolaus Copernicus (1473 – 1543).

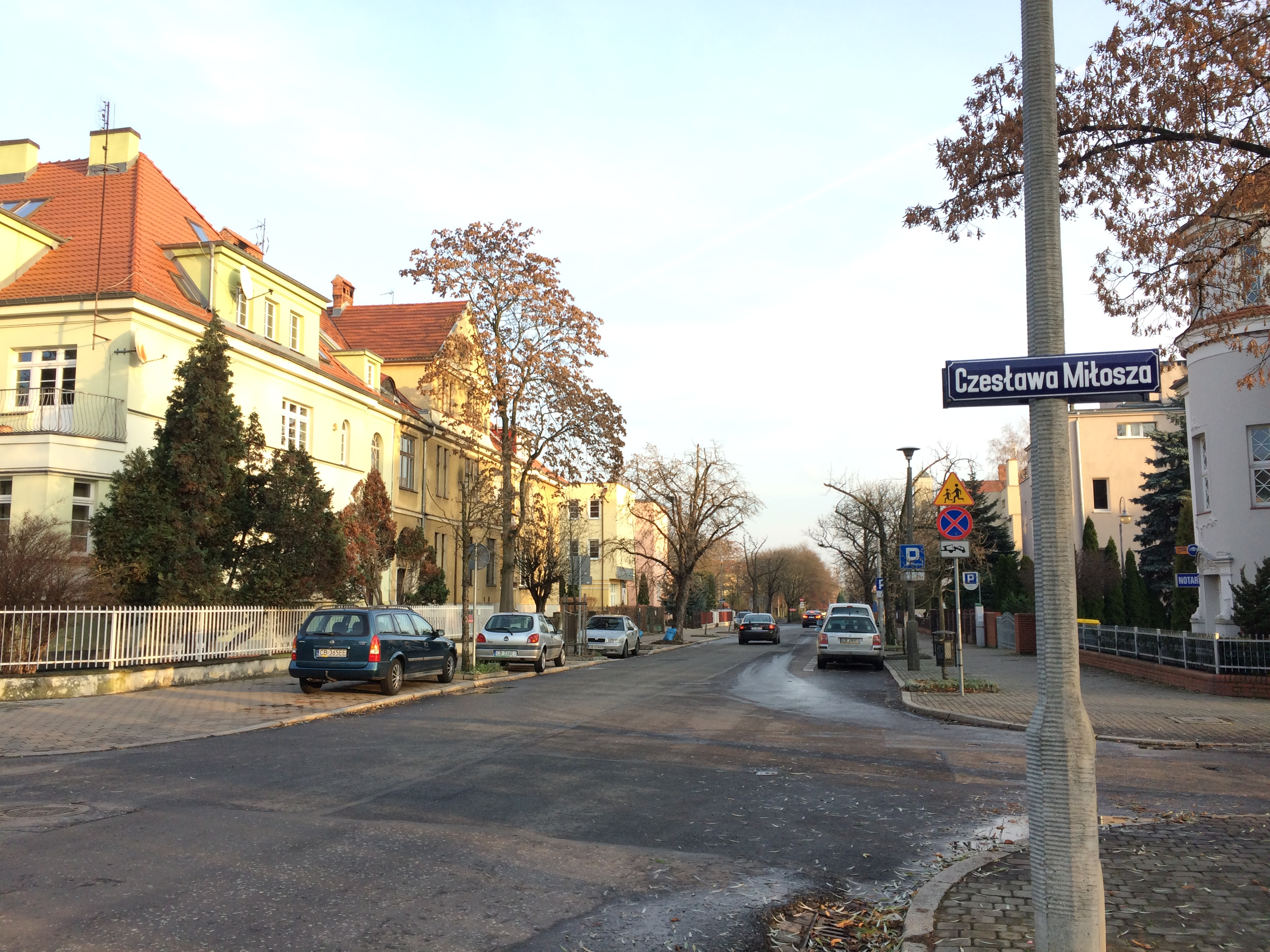
View of Kopernika street

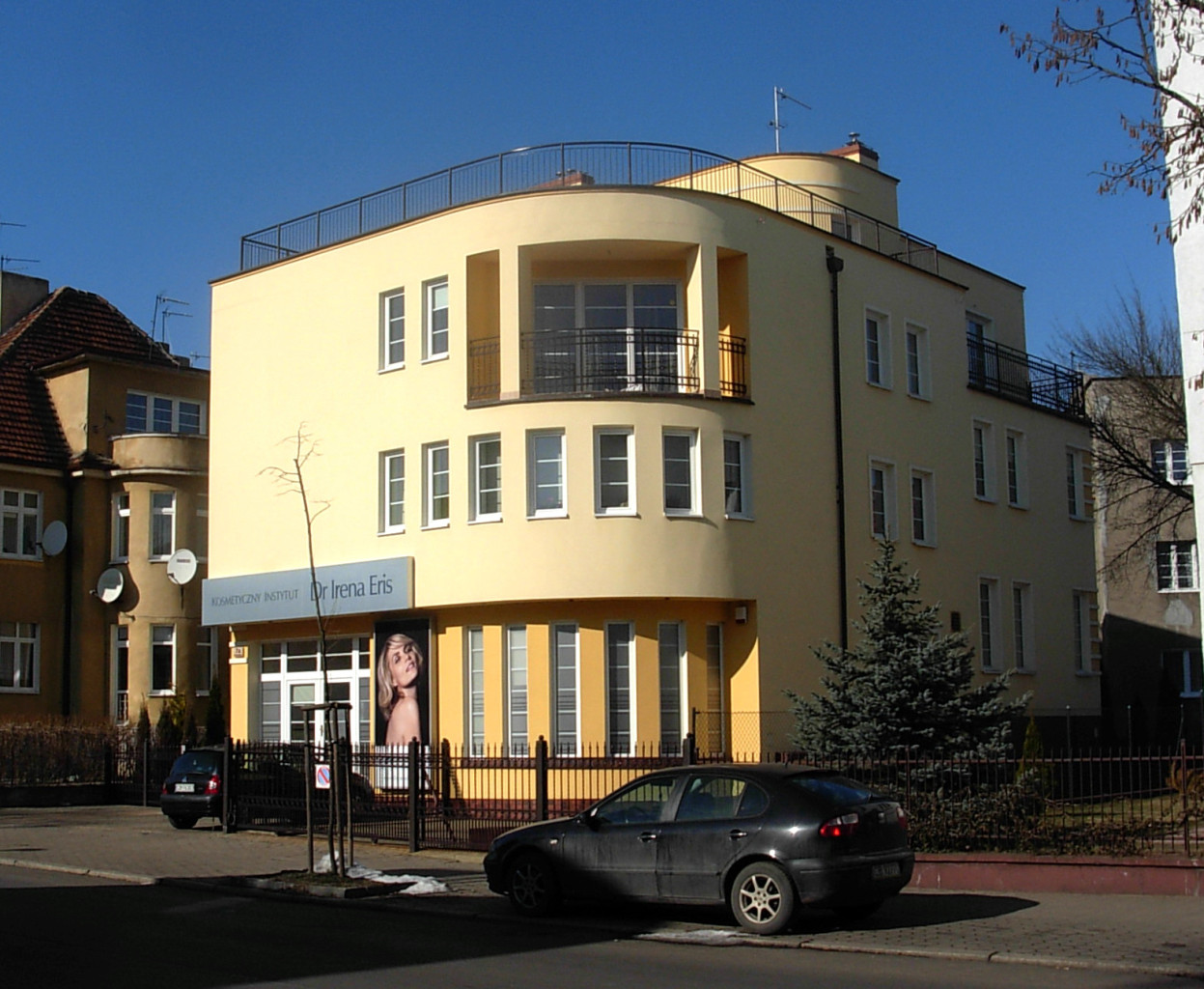
Villa at 7a by Bolesław Polakiewicz (1933–1933)

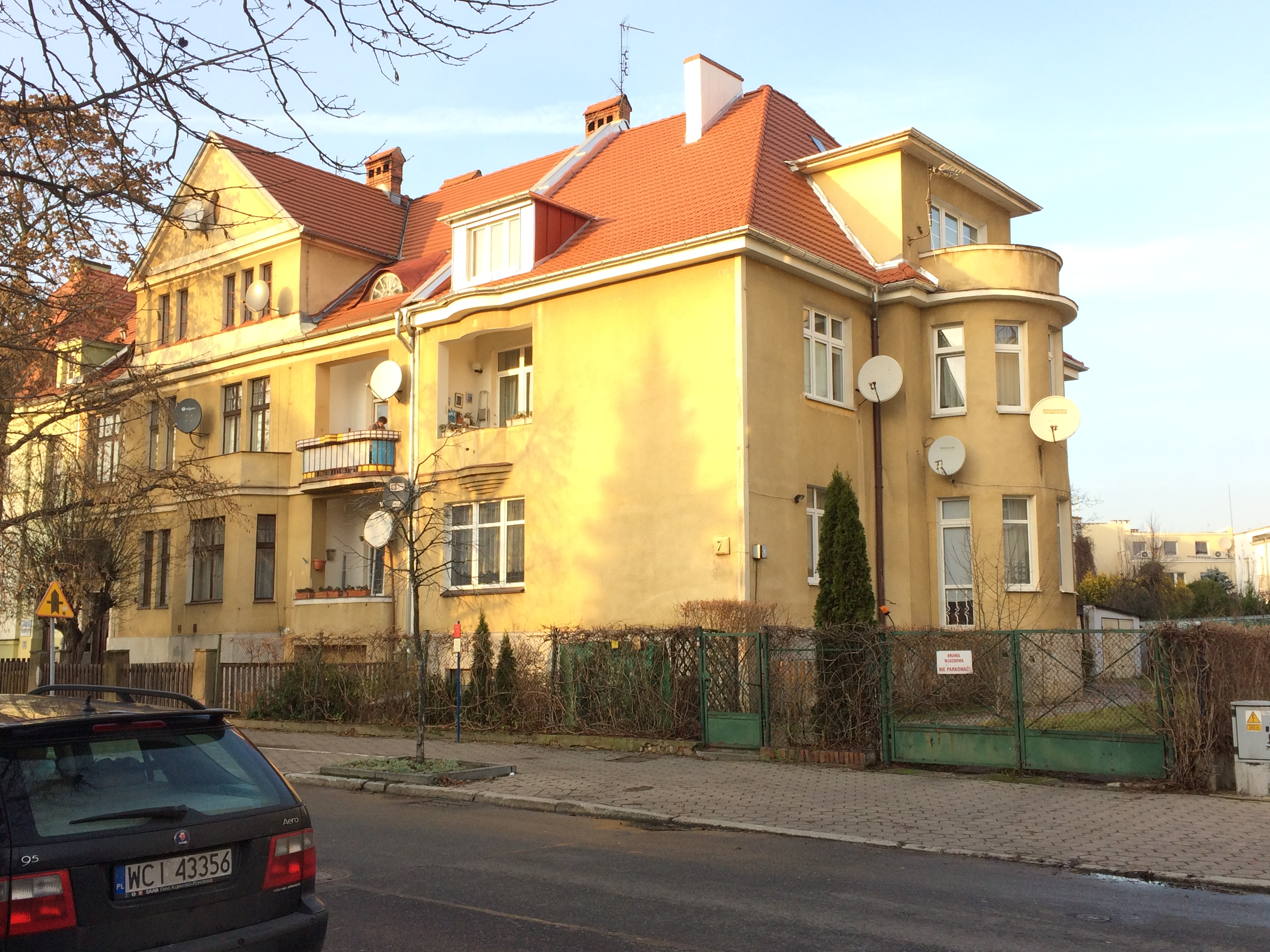
Villa at 5 by Rudolf Kern (1914–1916)

=== Adama Asnyka street ===
==== Bogdan Raczkowski villa at 1 ====
1932–1933, by Bogdan Raczkowski

Early Modernism

Located at the corner with Kopernika Street, the architect Bogdan Raczkowski designed it to be his own house. Later, Włodzimierz Raczkowski took ownership of the villa.

Part of the garden is dedicated to a tennis court.

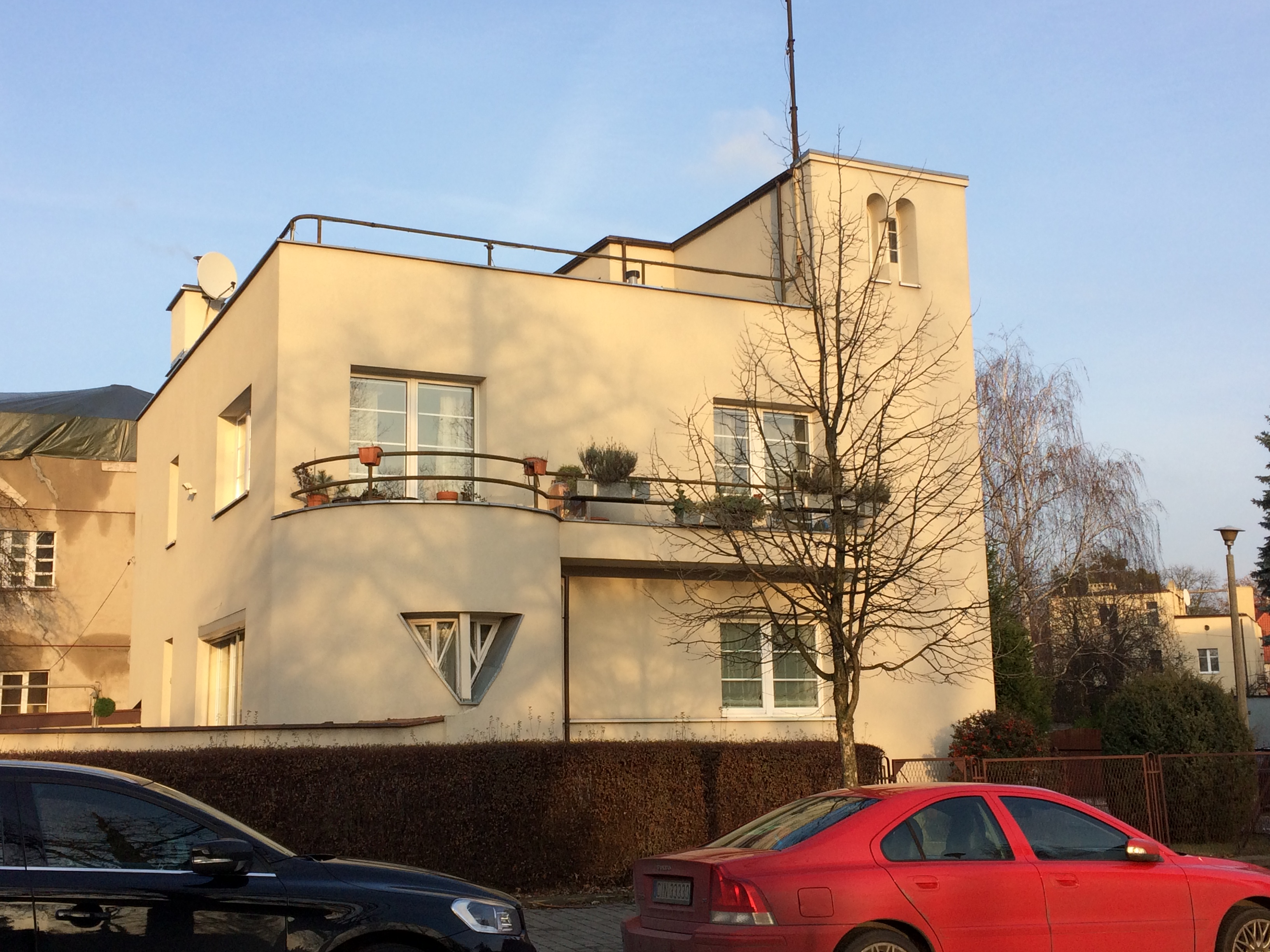

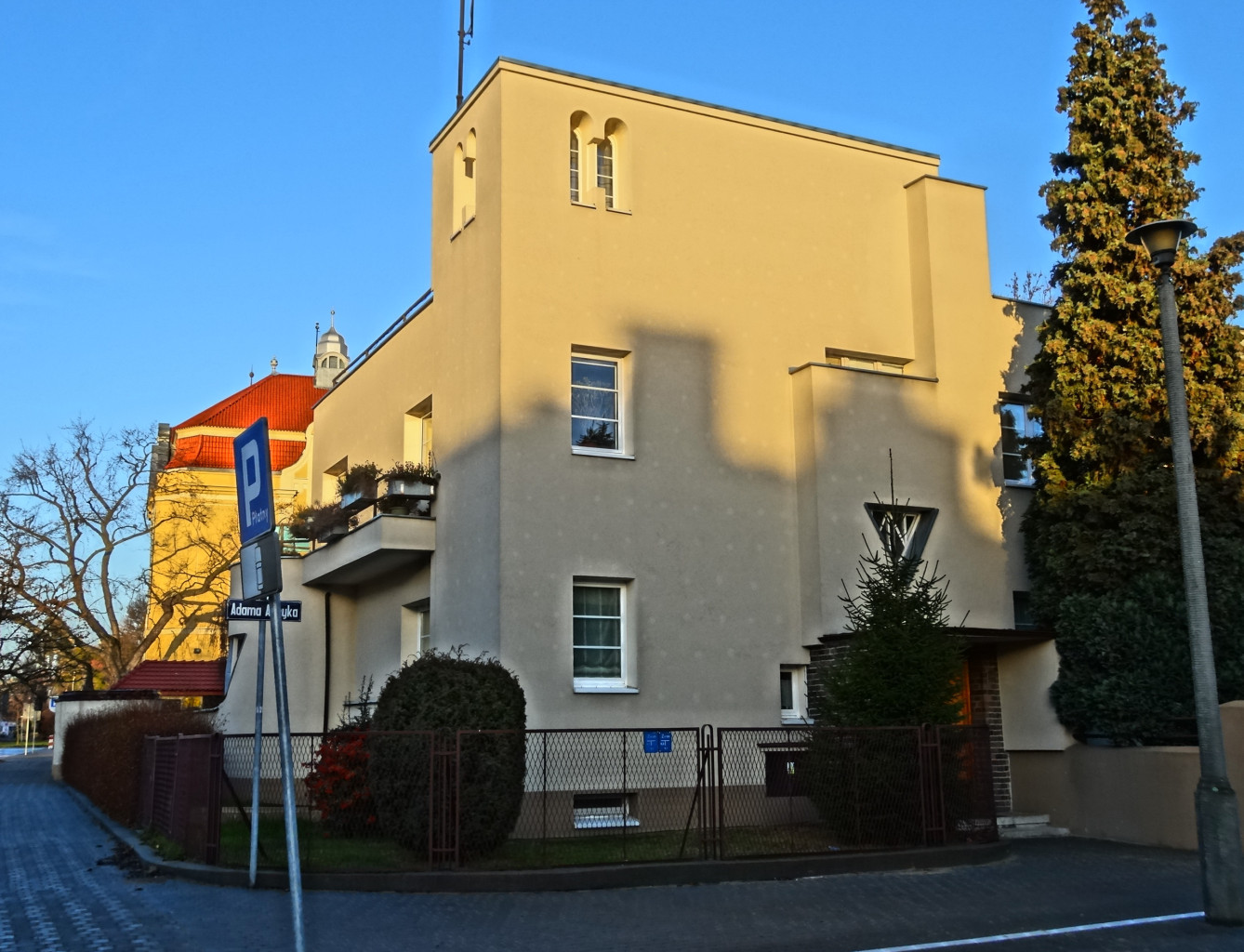

==== Villa at 1A ====
1939, by Bogdan Raczkowski

Modernism

One of the last houses built as part of the Sielanka estate project before the start of World War II.

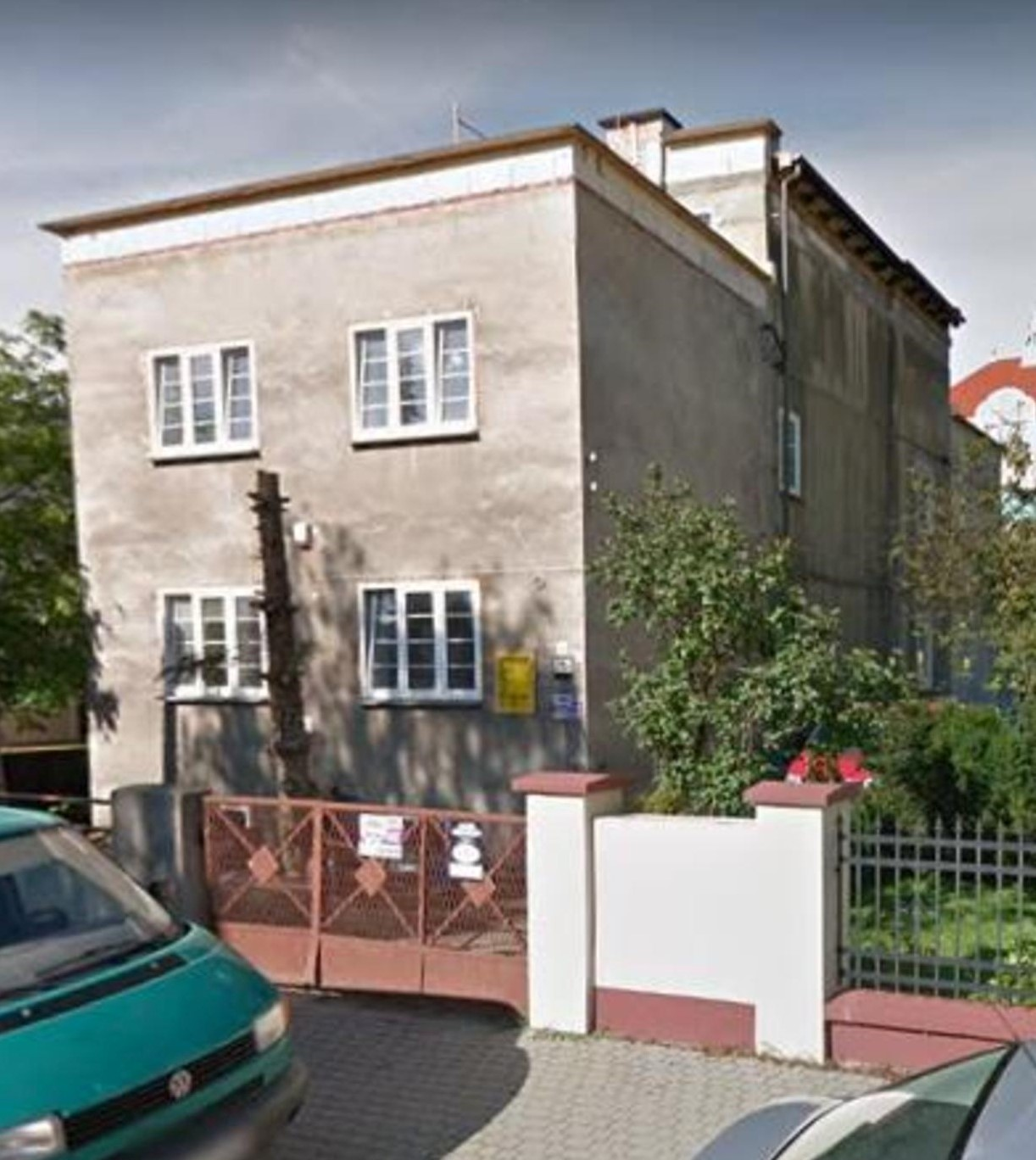

==== Villa at 2 ====
1933–1934, by Bolesław Polakiewicz

Modernism

One can notice the distinctive stained glass panels highlighting the staircase.

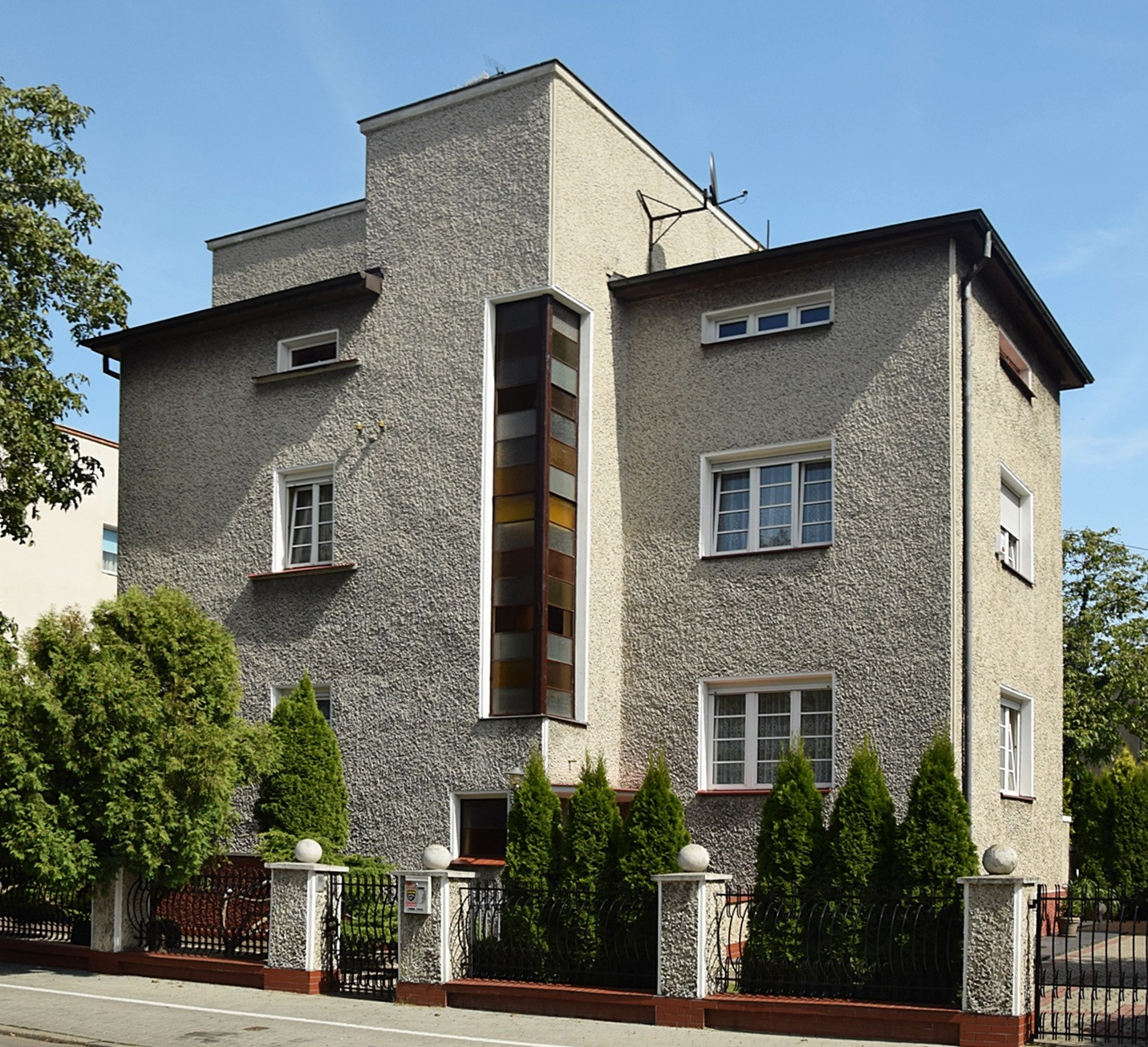

==== Villa at 3 ====
1933–1934, by Bolesław Polakiewicz

Modernism

First owner was Klemens Stark, a merchant.

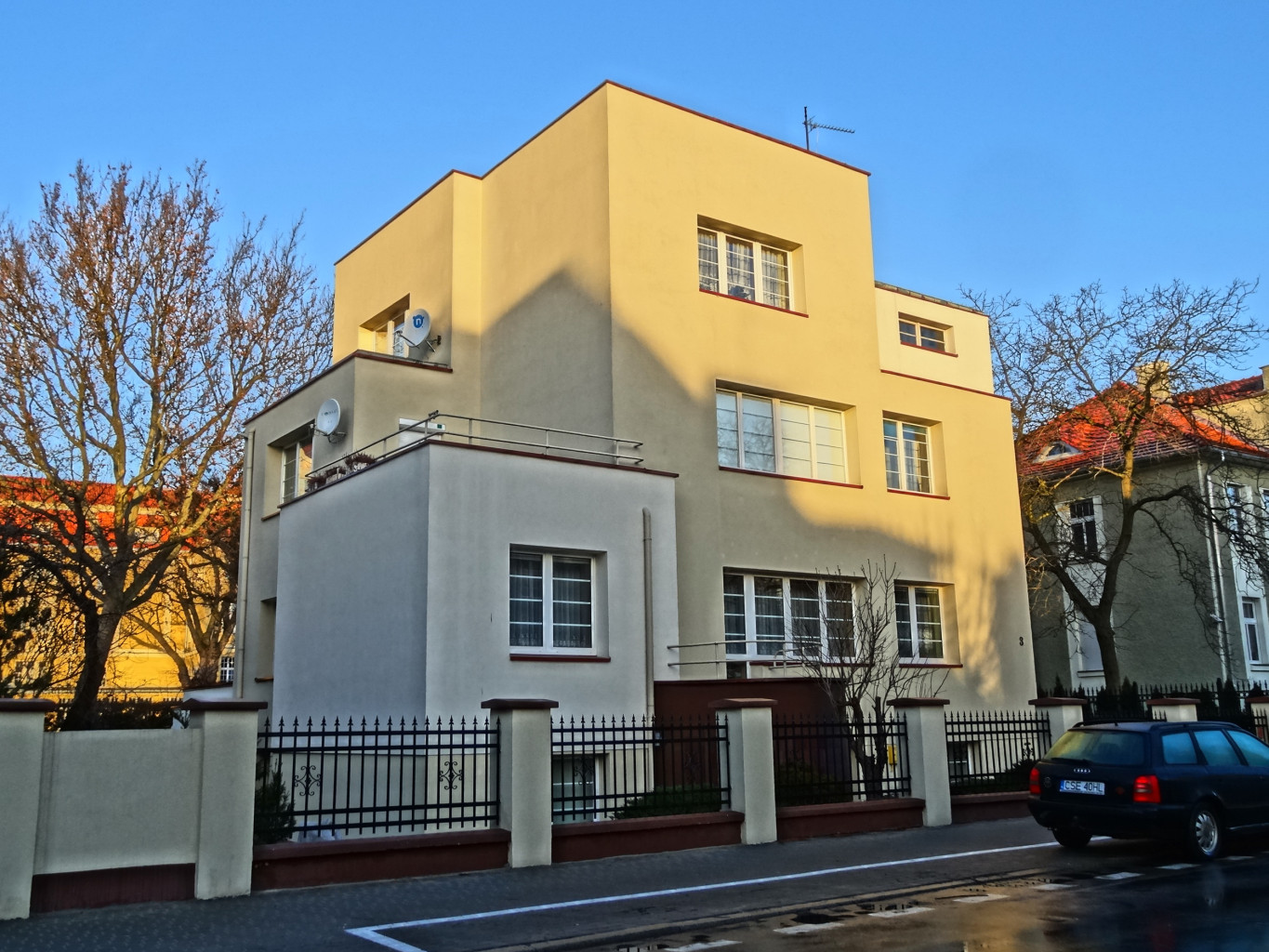

==== Villa at 4 ====
1932–1933, by Witold Eysymont

Modernism

Stanisław Dziurzynski, an engineer, was the commissioner of this house in the beginning of the 1930s.

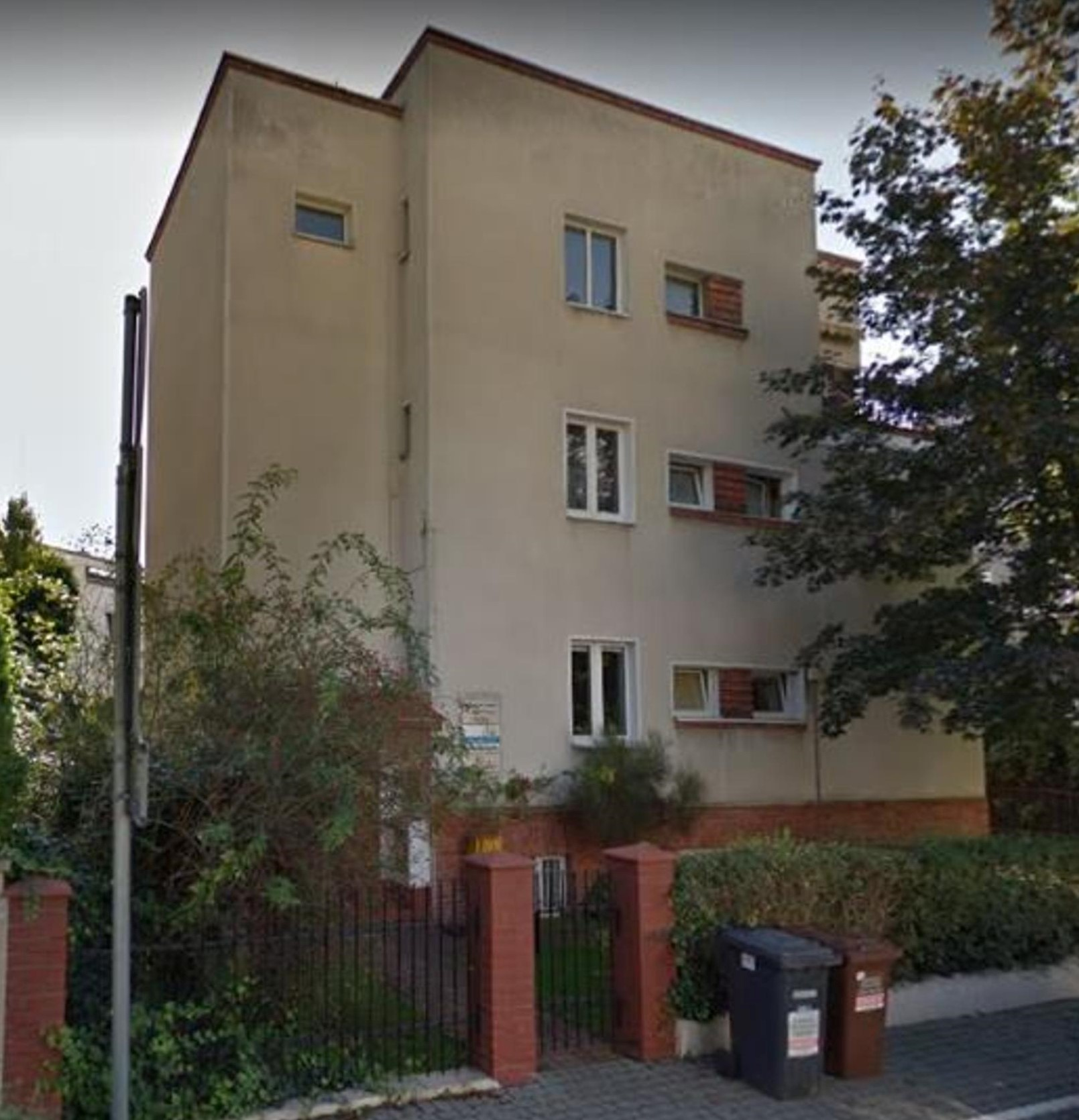

==== Villa at 5 ====
1927–1931, by Bronisław Jankowski

Polish National Style

The owner of the villa was Paweł Aleksandrowicz, a reserve colonel. Living initially at 4 Śniadeckich Street, he moved there in 1936–1937.

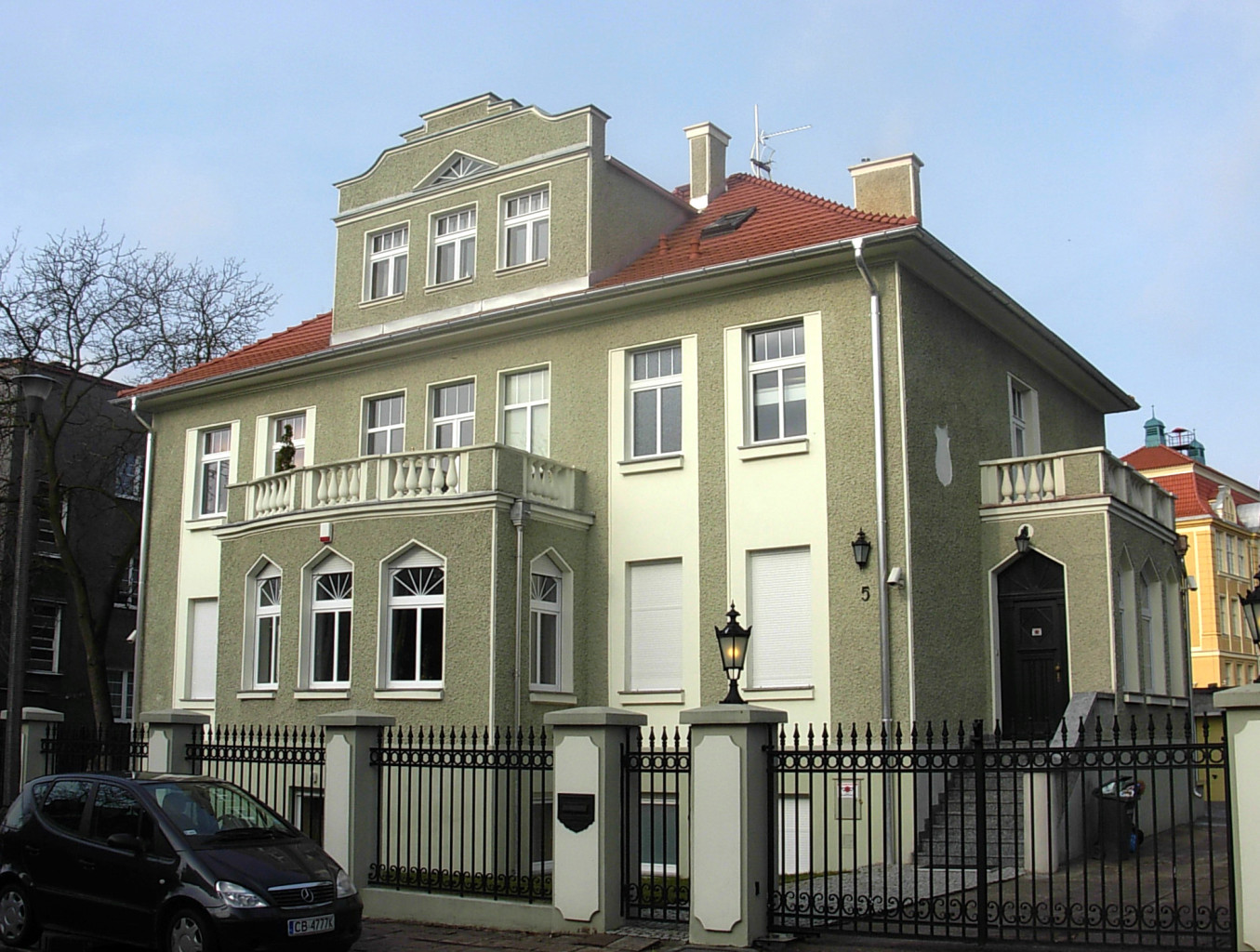

==== Villa at 6 ====
1933–1934, by Jan Kossowski

Streamline Moderne

The initial investor was a doctor, Stefan Gaszyński. Before the completion of construction, the house was bought by lawyer Stanisław Kaszyński, who had his office at 17 Gdańska Street.

The villa is decorated with a glazed, rounded bay window, terraces and balconies resembling ship captain's bridges (see e.g.: bent metal balustrades). Large windows on the ground floor connect the interior with the garden greenery.

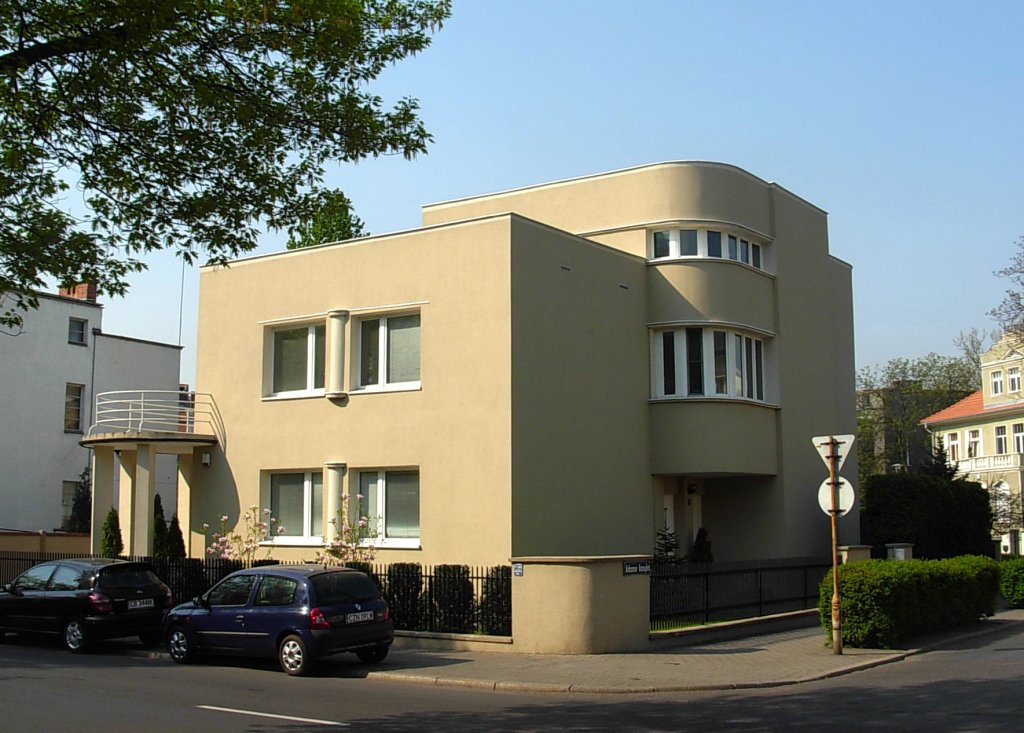

==== Villa at 7 ====
1927–1928, by Bronisław Jankowski

Polish National Style

The oldest house in Asnyka street, originally commissioned by Brigadier General Aleksander Ehrbar, who commanded the 16th Uhlan regiment. Before moving there in 1933, he was living at 7 Reja Street.

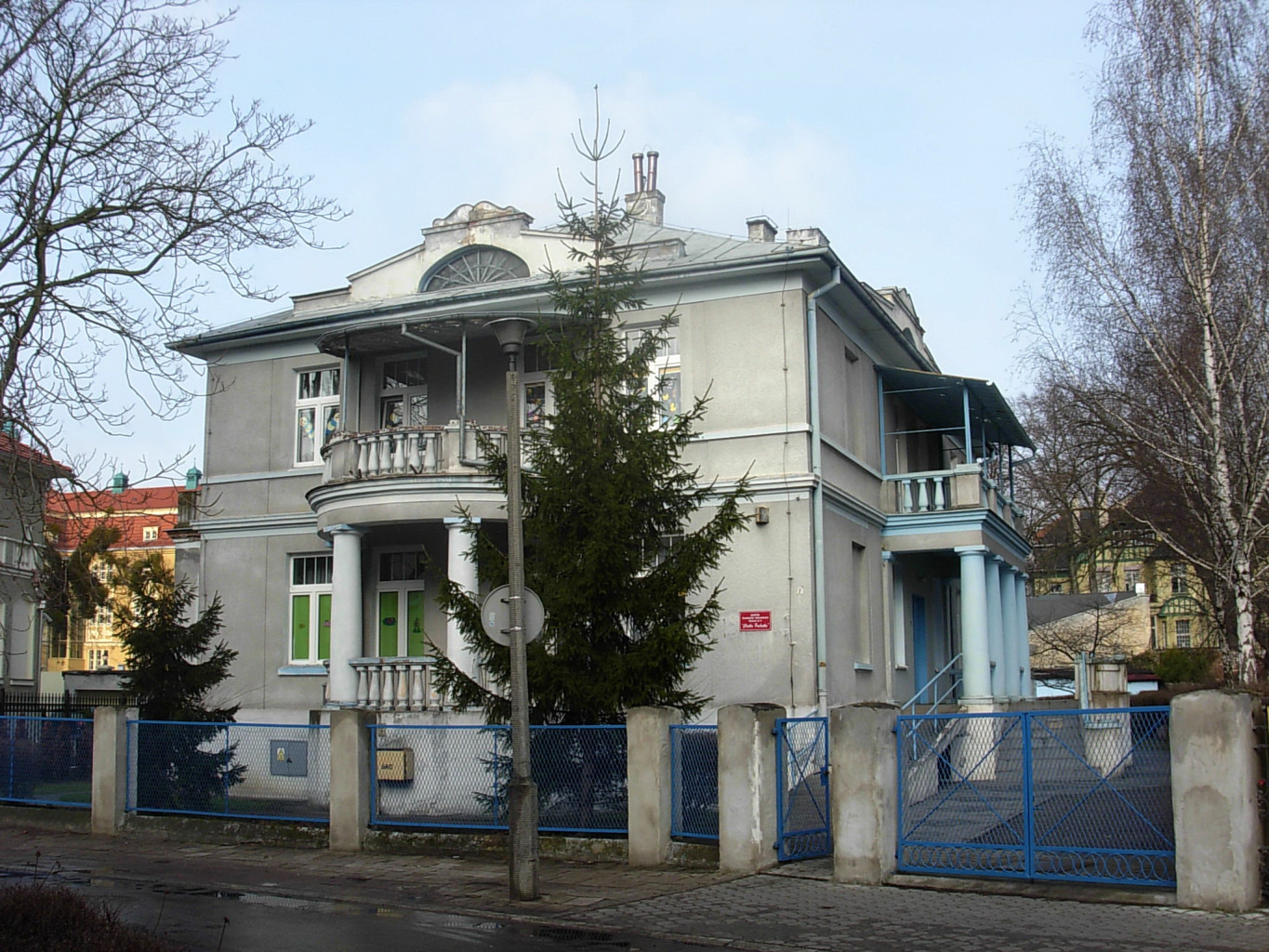

=== Stanisława Wyspiańskiego Street ===
==== Tadeusz Mieczkowski villa at 2 ====
1927–28, by Tadeusz Mieczkowski

Early Modernism and Polish National Style

Tadeusz Mieczkowski, an engineer, designed the villa and lived there until the outbreak of the Second World War.

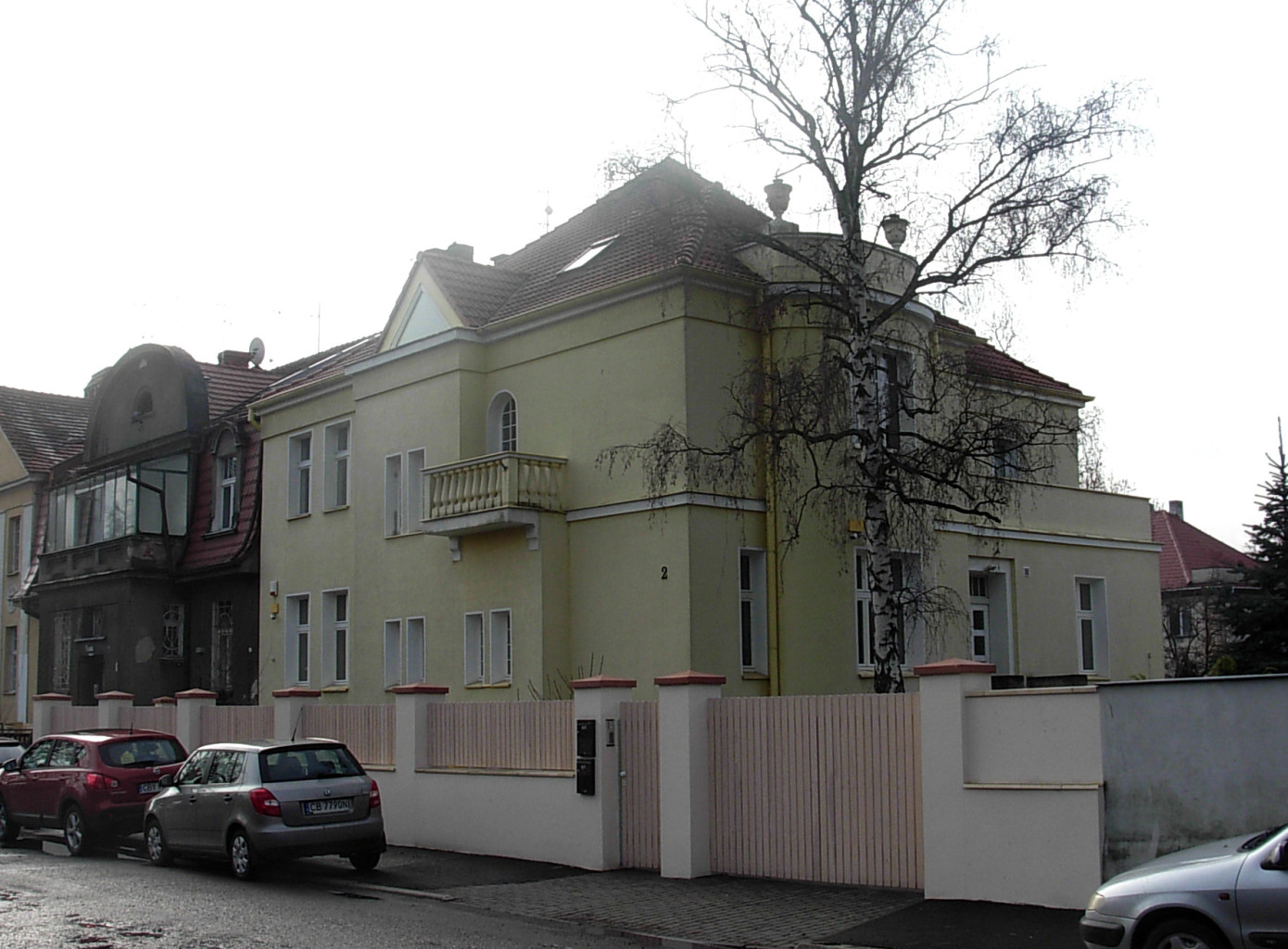

==== Villa at 4 ====
1914–1915, by Gustaw Burschat

Late Art Nouveau and Polish National Style

Leopold Siedlecki is the first registered owner in the early 1920s, although the house is part of the batch of the first realizations during the Prussian period. The style reflects this, exhibiting Art Nouveau elements, in particular around the portal.

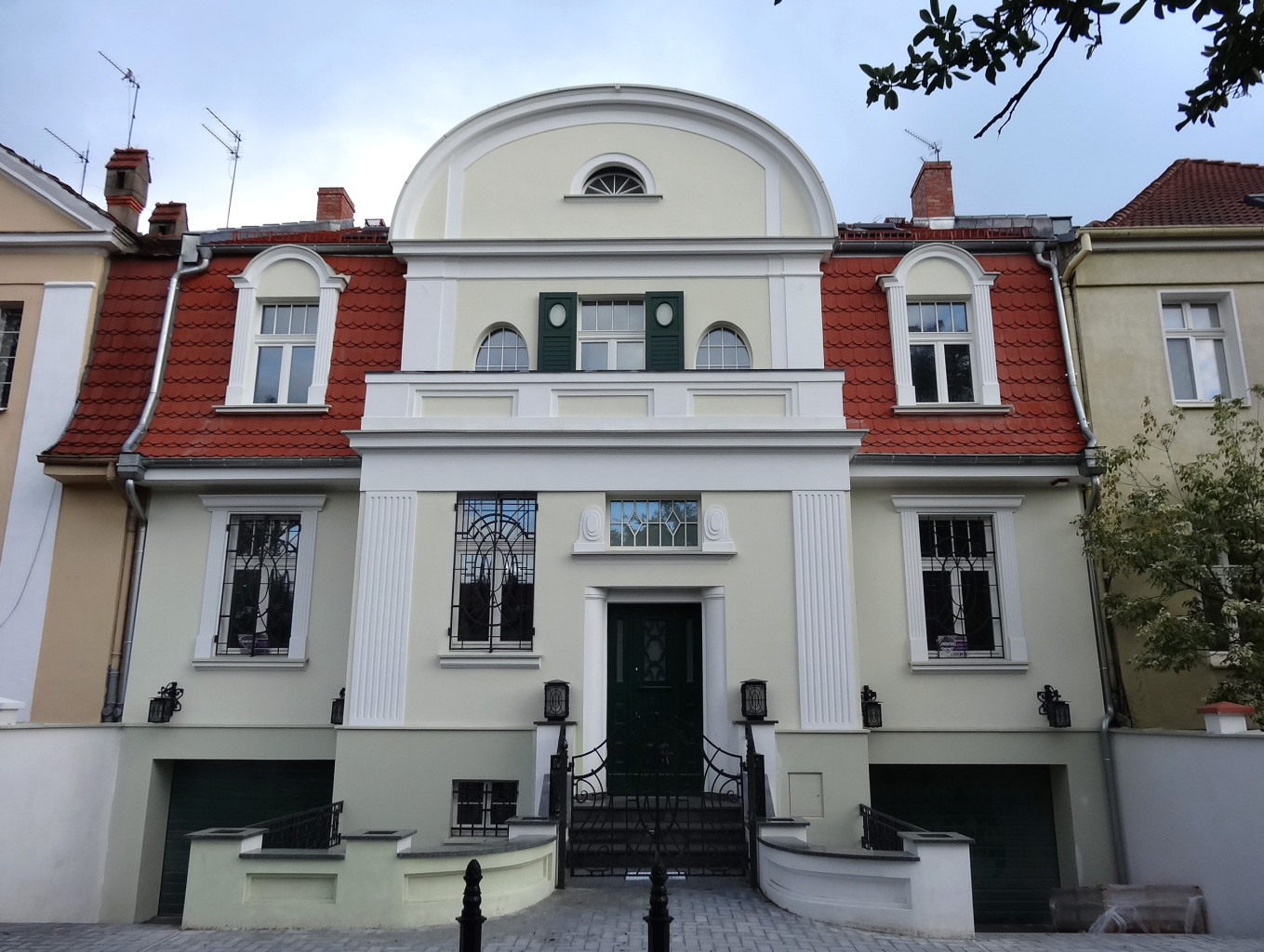

==== Kurtz Seydler villa at 6 ====
1914, by Rudolf Kern

Late Art Nouveau and Polish National Style

Kurtz Seydler ran a wallpaper business downtown, at Dantziger Straße 158 (today's 24 Gdańska Street). Here, one can notice the grand portal flanked by columns, topped by a wrought iron-motifs balcony, the two rosettes surrounded by lesenes and the oeil-de-boeuf on the top of the facade.

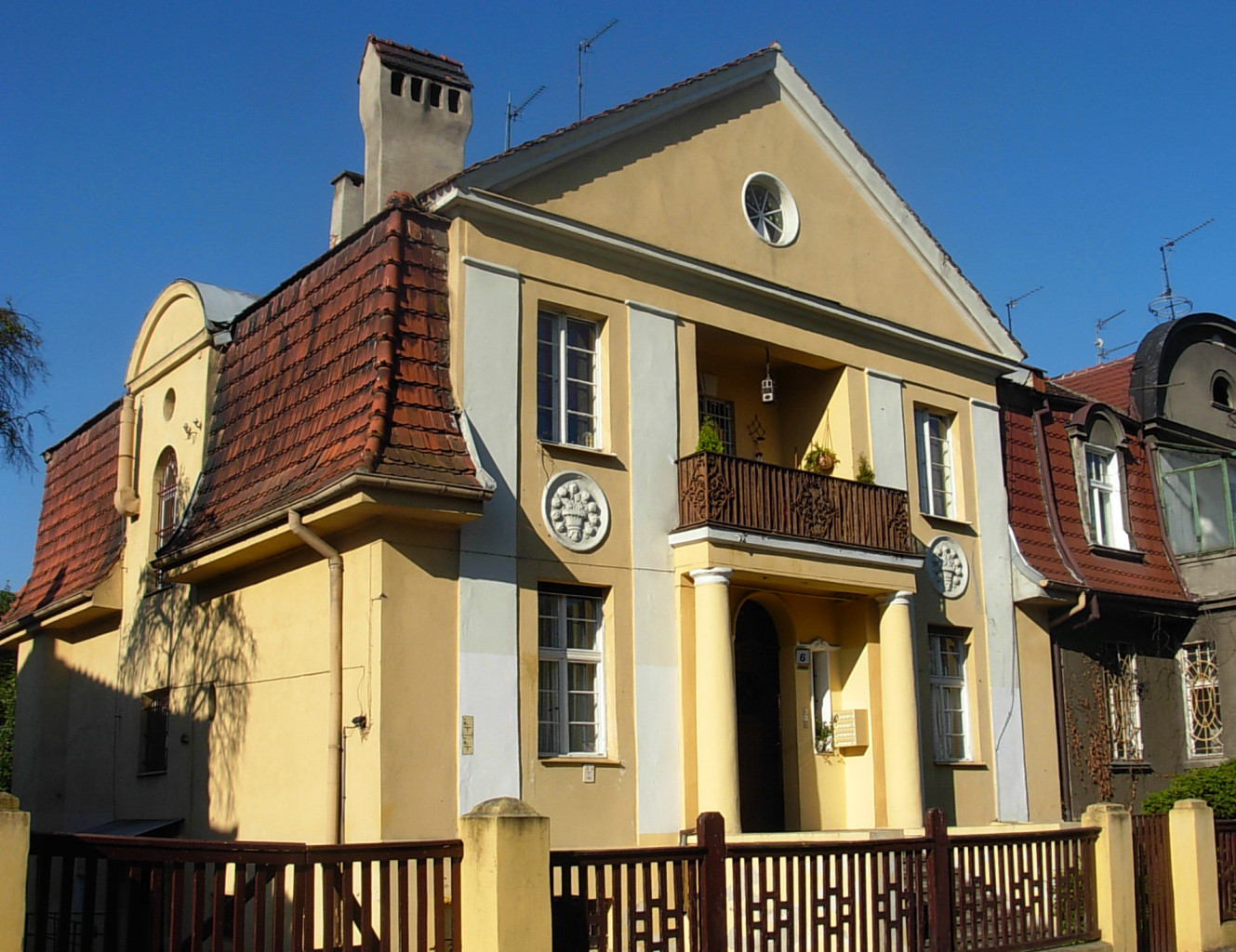

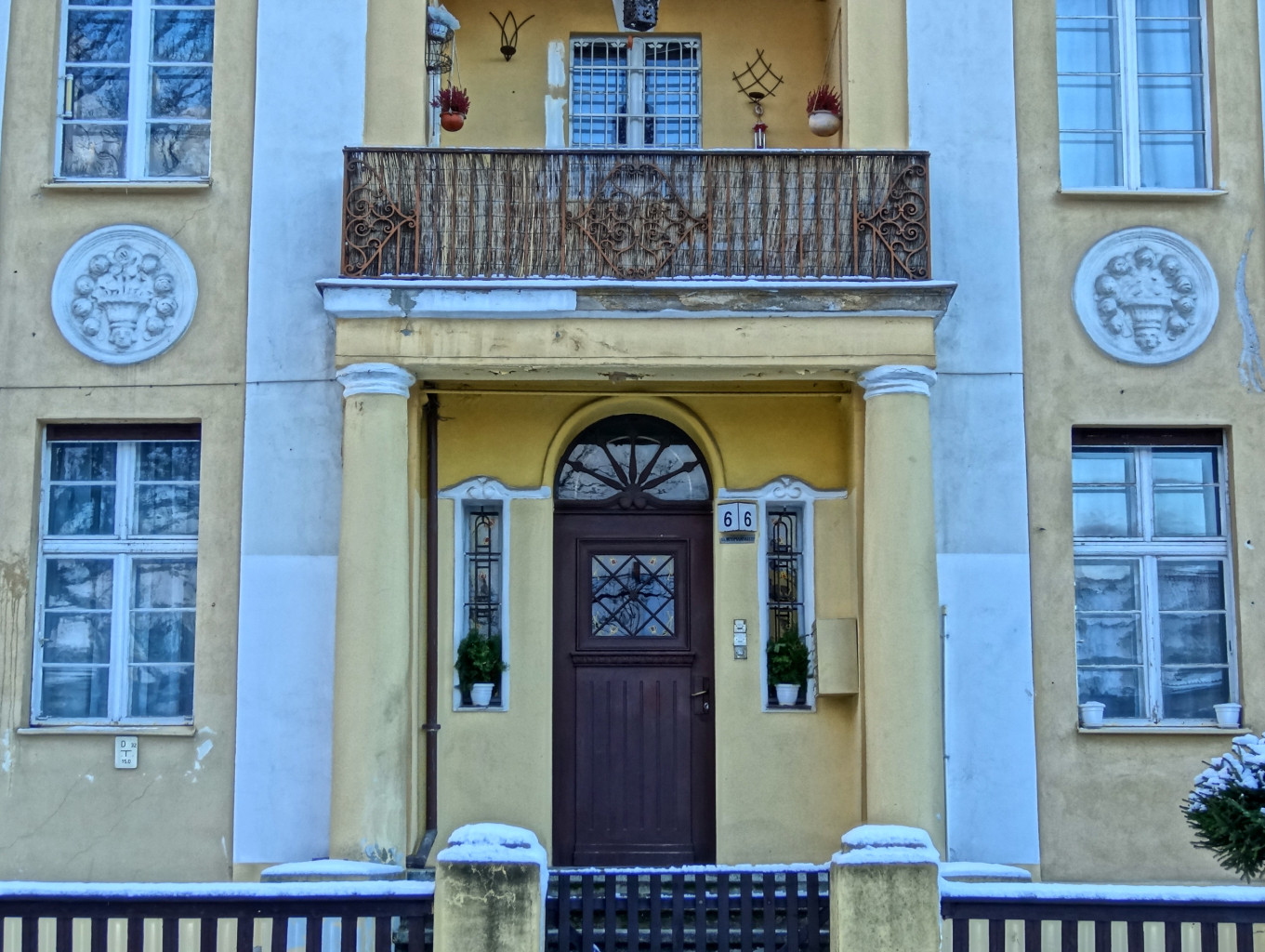

==== Villa at 8 ====
1914–1917, by Theodor Patzwald

Polish National Style

Completed just before the start of the First World War, Paweł Schönerstädt (or Schoenerstaedt), a factory manager, was its first owner. Here, the portal is brought up to a higher level of decoration resembling the Neo-baroque style, including a large triangular pediment supported by four marble Corinthian order columns. Furthermore, the entrance door is heavily adorned with floral motifs and another couple of pink columns. The rest of the facade is highlighted with pilasters, a crowning frieze and a half-moon oeil-de-boeuf.

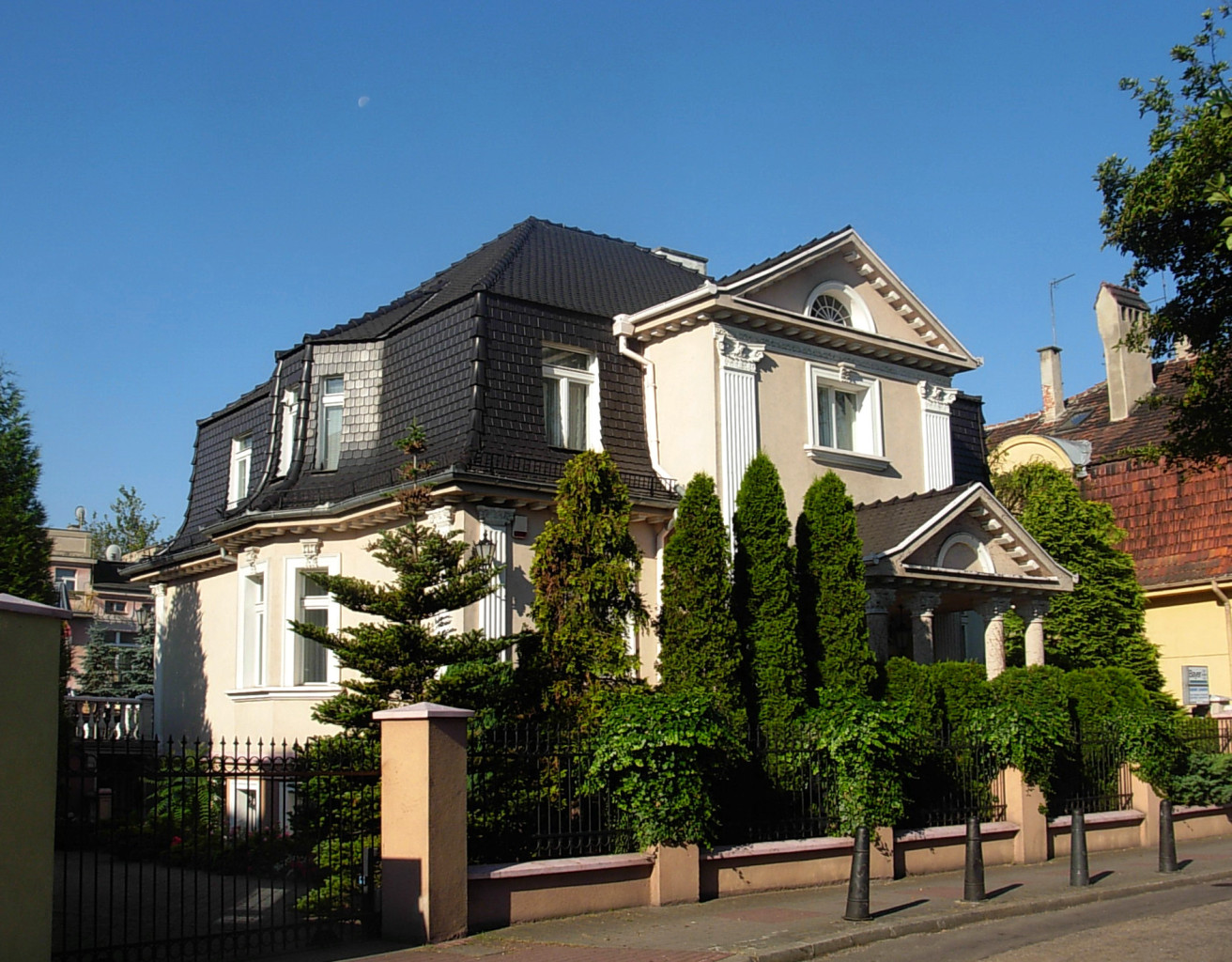

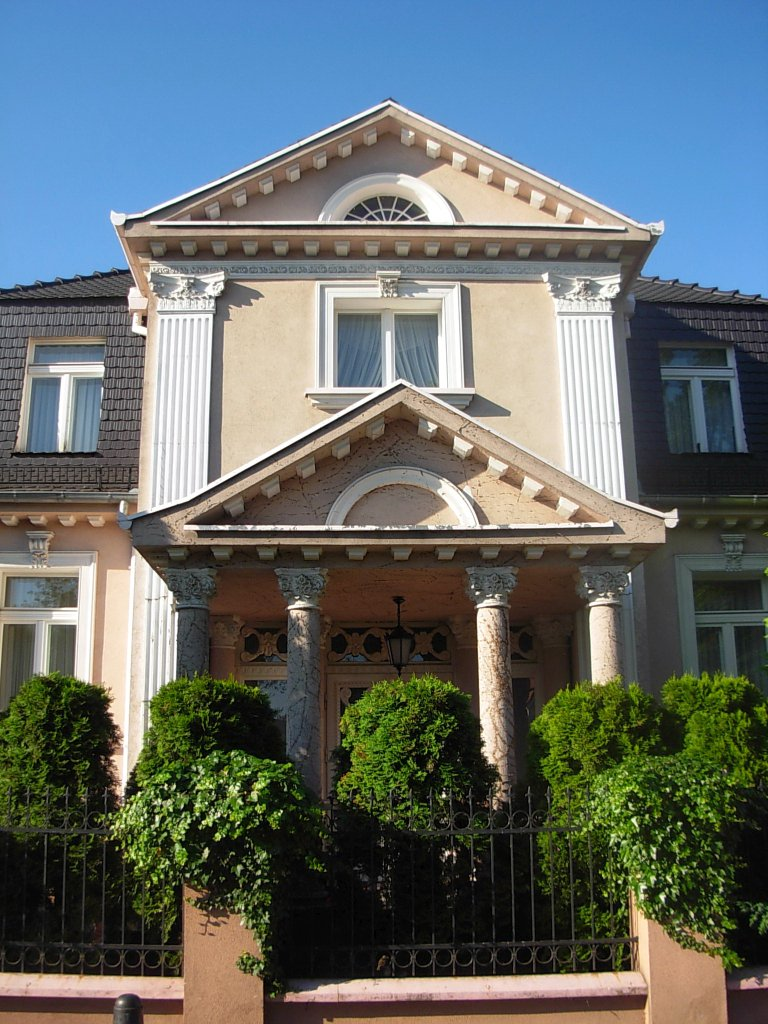

==== Kazimizerz Panek villa at 10 ====
1928–1930, by Józef Grodzki

Early Modernism and Polish National Style

Dr. Kazimierz Panek was a professor at a university. His widow survived him in the house until WWII. The villa is located at the corner with Sielanka Street. The main elevation on Wyspiańskiego street displays a nice transom light door highlighted by pilasters and wall lesenes.

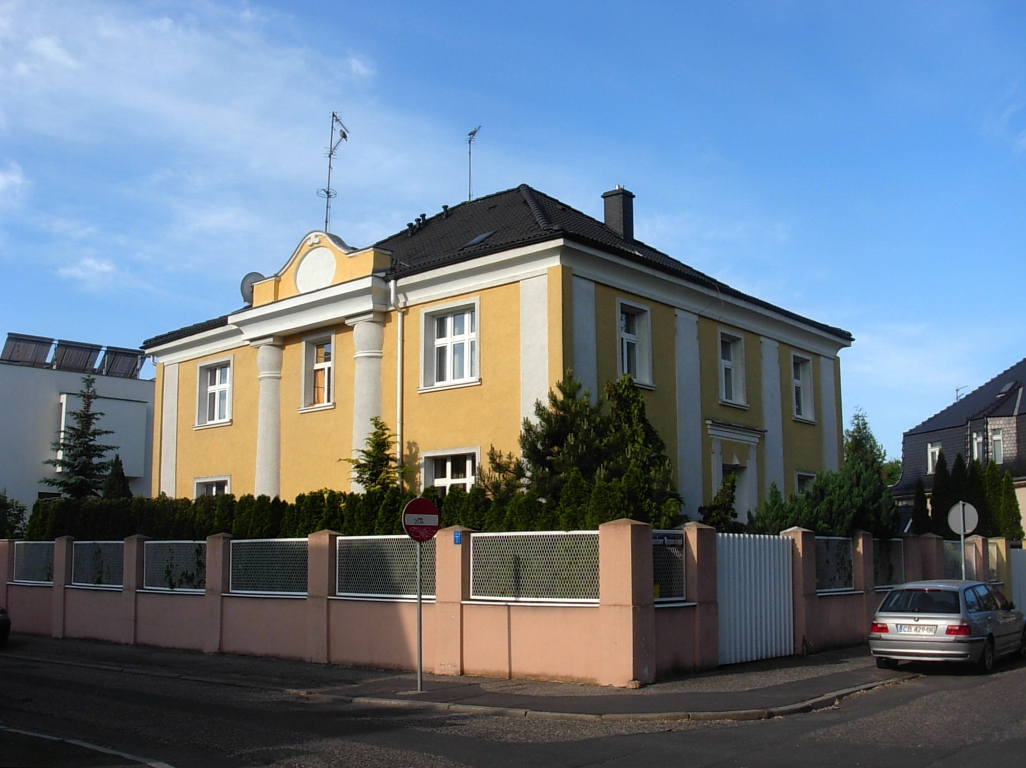

=== Jana Kasprowicza Street ===
==== Villa at 2 ====
1927–29, by Bronisław Jankowski

Polish National Style

The first registered owner was an engineer, Teodor Krieger. Today, the house harbors the seat of the Chamber of Commerce "Wodociągi Polskie" (English: Polish Waterworks), the only economic self-government organization in the water and sewage sector in Poland, established in September 1992.

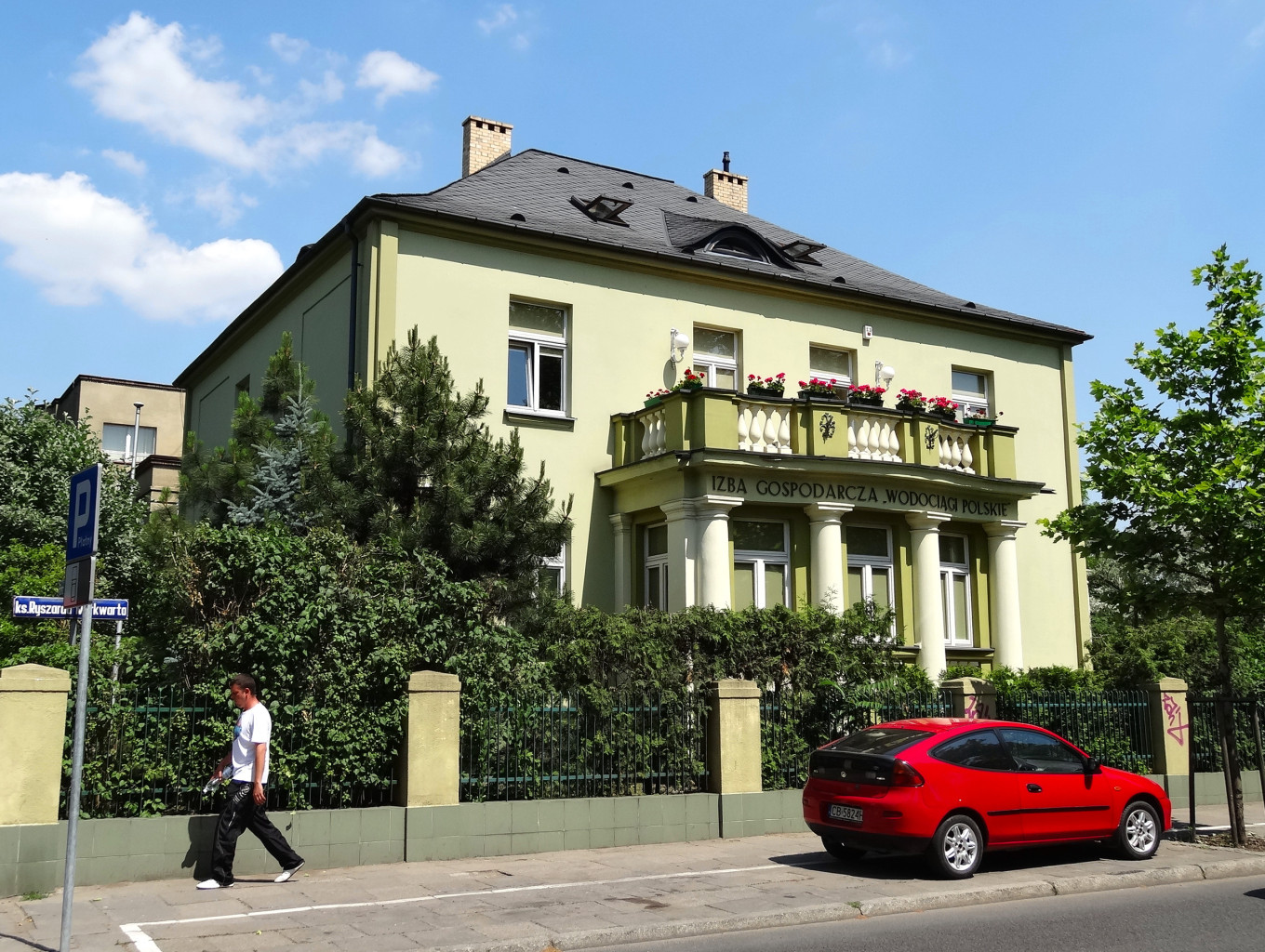

==== Villa at 4 ====
1933–1934, by Bolesław Polakiewicz

Functionalism

The first known landlord was Włodzimierz Hordyński, the director of the bank Spółdzielcza Kasa Oszczędnościowo-Kredytowa (SKOK), with headquarters located at 1 Hermana Frankego street (present day Stary Port Street).

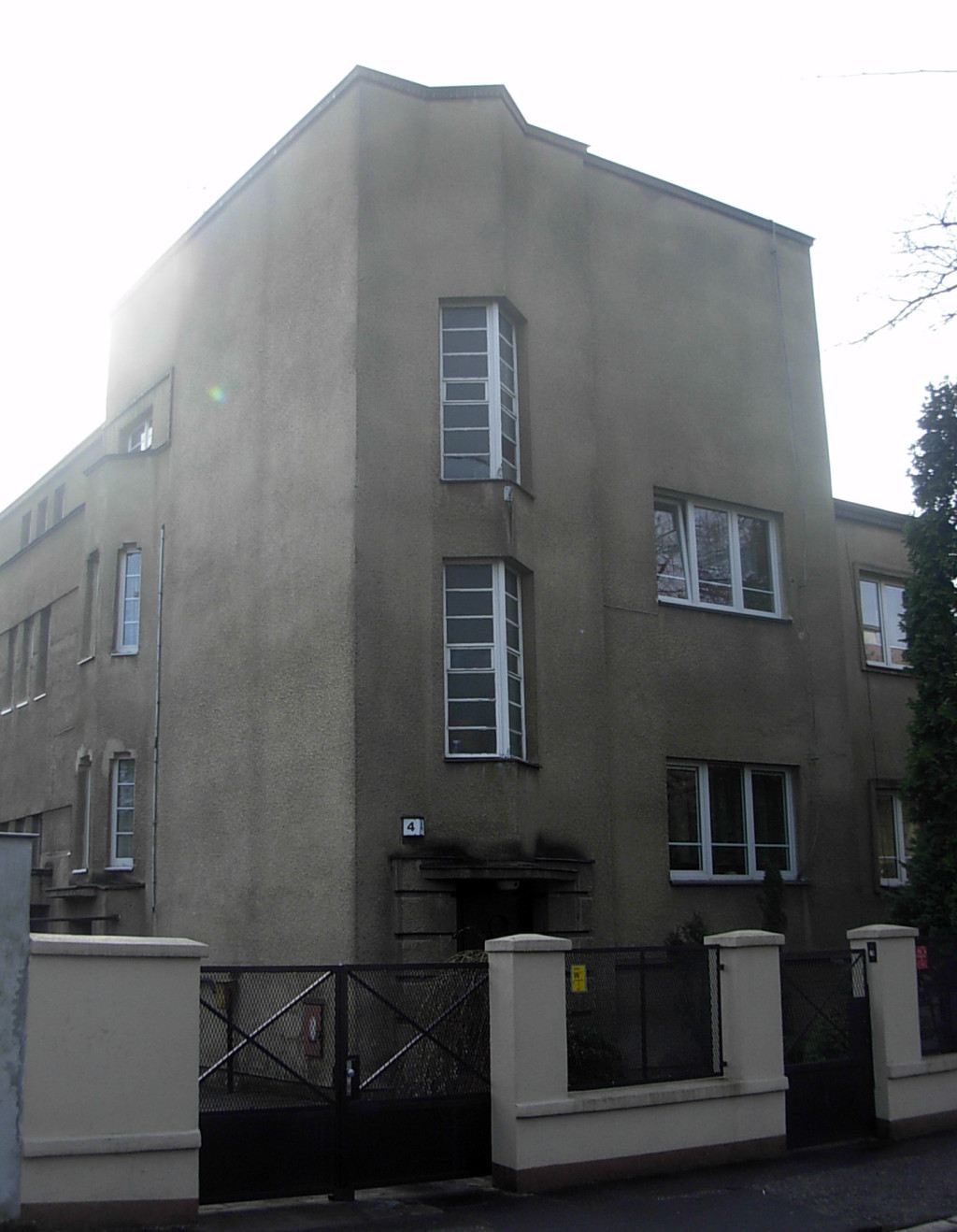

=== Władysława Reymonta street ===
This short street path is located between the Leszka Białego Square on the south and Bydgoszcz University building Copernicanum on the north.

=== Czesława Miłosza street ===
Initially named "Wilsona street" in reference to the American President Woodrow Wilson, this tiny path is bordered on its western flank by the Copernicanum and the Kopernika Square, while its eastern side stems from the Turwid Square and crosses Sielanka street to end at Kopernika street.

=== Squares ===
==== Marian Turwid Square ====
The original 0.4 hectares (0.99 acres) square design has been modified in 1925 by the engineer Marian Guntzl, who created a new garden layout, in the same way he will later design the nearby Botanic Garden. It has been named in reference to Marian Turwid (1905–1987), a Polish writer, painter and cultural activist in Bydgoszcz.

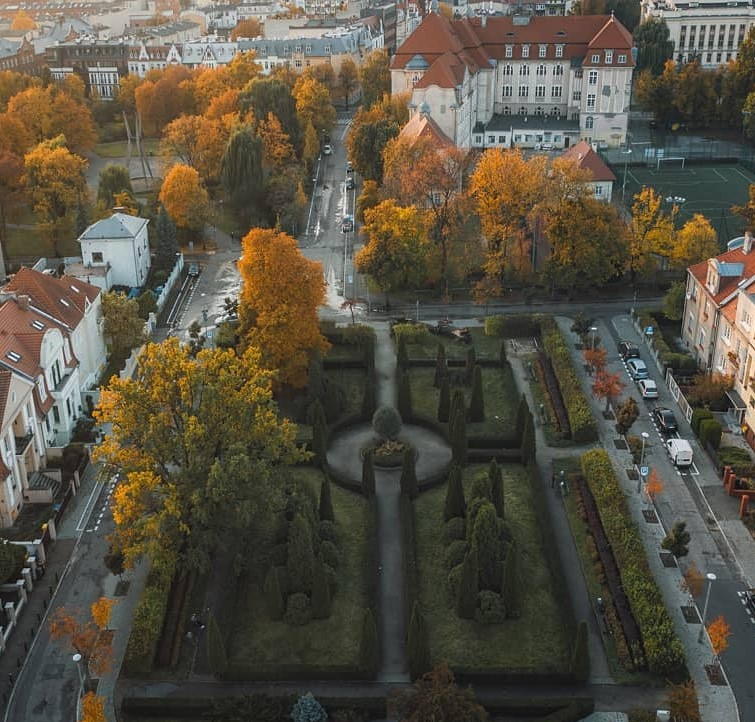
Bird eye view square

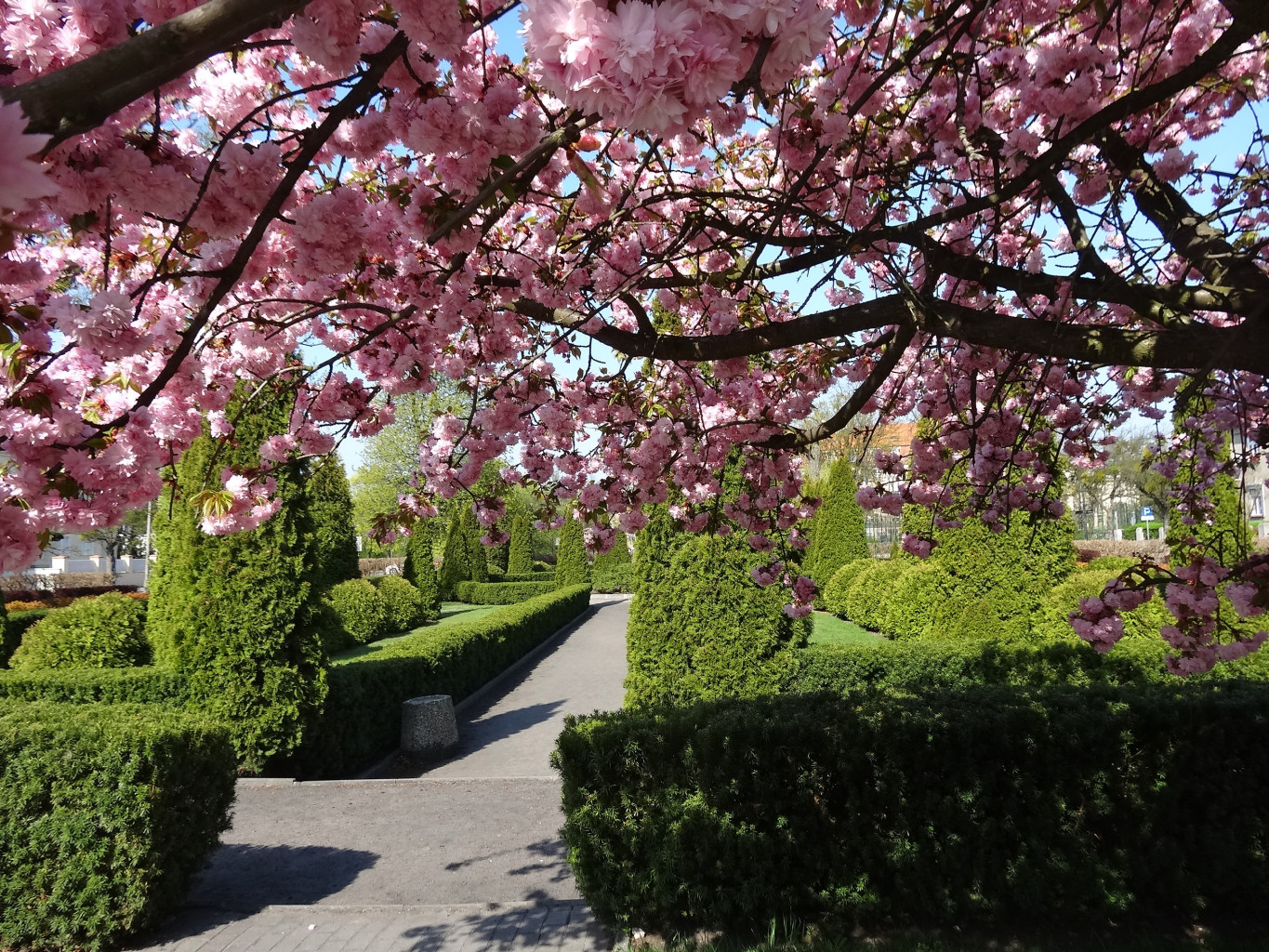
Plaza in springtime

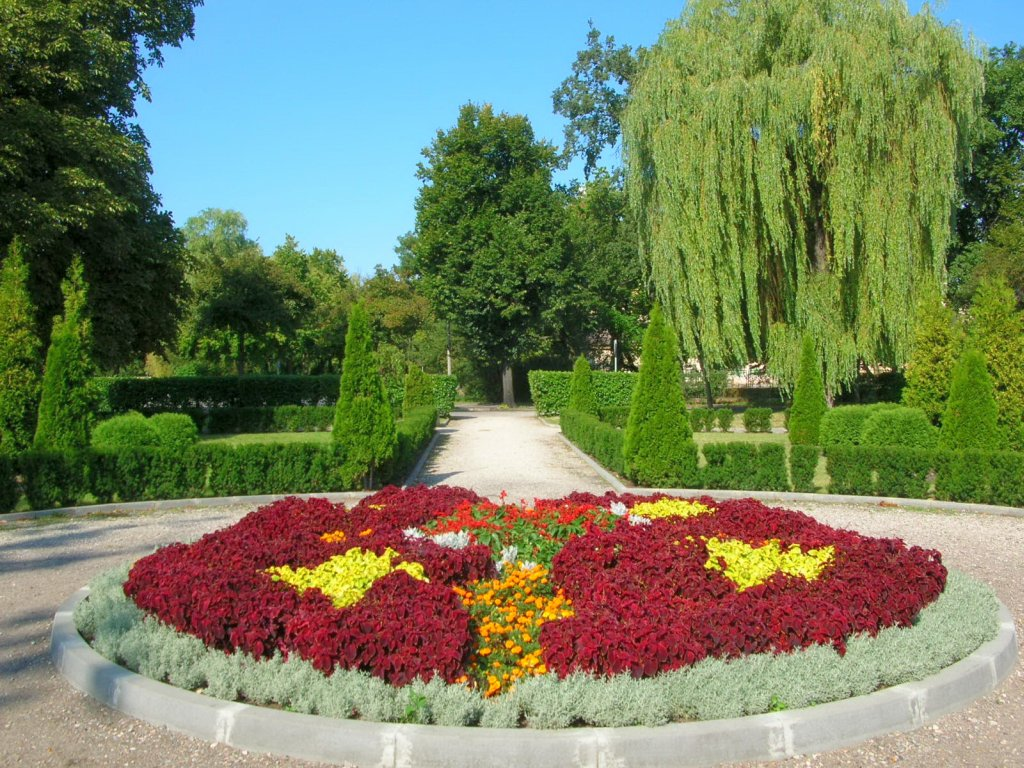
Flowers in summer

==== Leszka Białego Square ====
The Sielanka project included this square as a property of the Province of Posen (German: Provinz Posen), not owned by the municipality. After the rebirth of Poland in 1918, the area was ordered to be constructed, with nothing actually being completed. In the 1960s, a memorial was built to commemorate the Millennium of the Polish State (Polish: Pomnik Tysiąclecia Państwa Polskiego). Designed by Polish artist Stanislaw Lejkowski, it was unveiled on July 22, 1967. The entire scheme, however, was never achieved: the nest in the tripod was supposed to be crowned with the Piast eagle, considered by the communist authorities to be too similar to the symbols used during World War II by the Polish Armed Forces in the West. In 2011, the city even had plans to demolish it. It didn't follow through with them, as the deconstruction turned out to be too expensive.

The site has been given the name of Lieutenant Leszek the White in November 2013. Leszek the White was a hero of the Home Army during the Second World War. His father Ludwik lived at 1 Sielanka Street. Under the codename Jakub, he was arrested in February 1945 by members of soviet controlled Ministry of Public Security and was murdered during interrogations on March 3, 1945. In October 1956, his remains were discovered in the basement of the UB building then located at 4 Markwarta street. A renovated stone memorial to honor Leszek Biały and his heroic comrades has been unveiled in 2013.

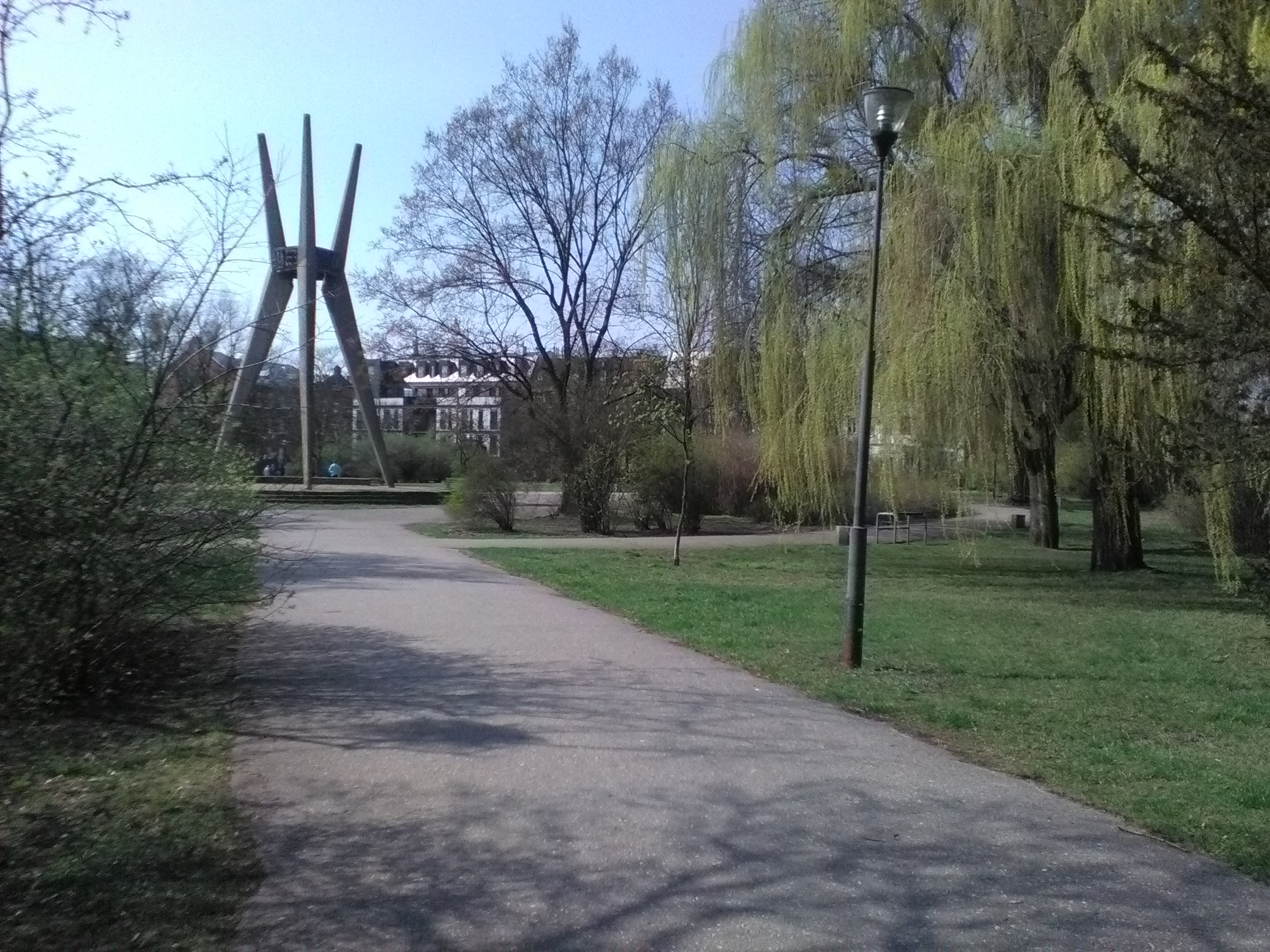
The square from Markwarta street

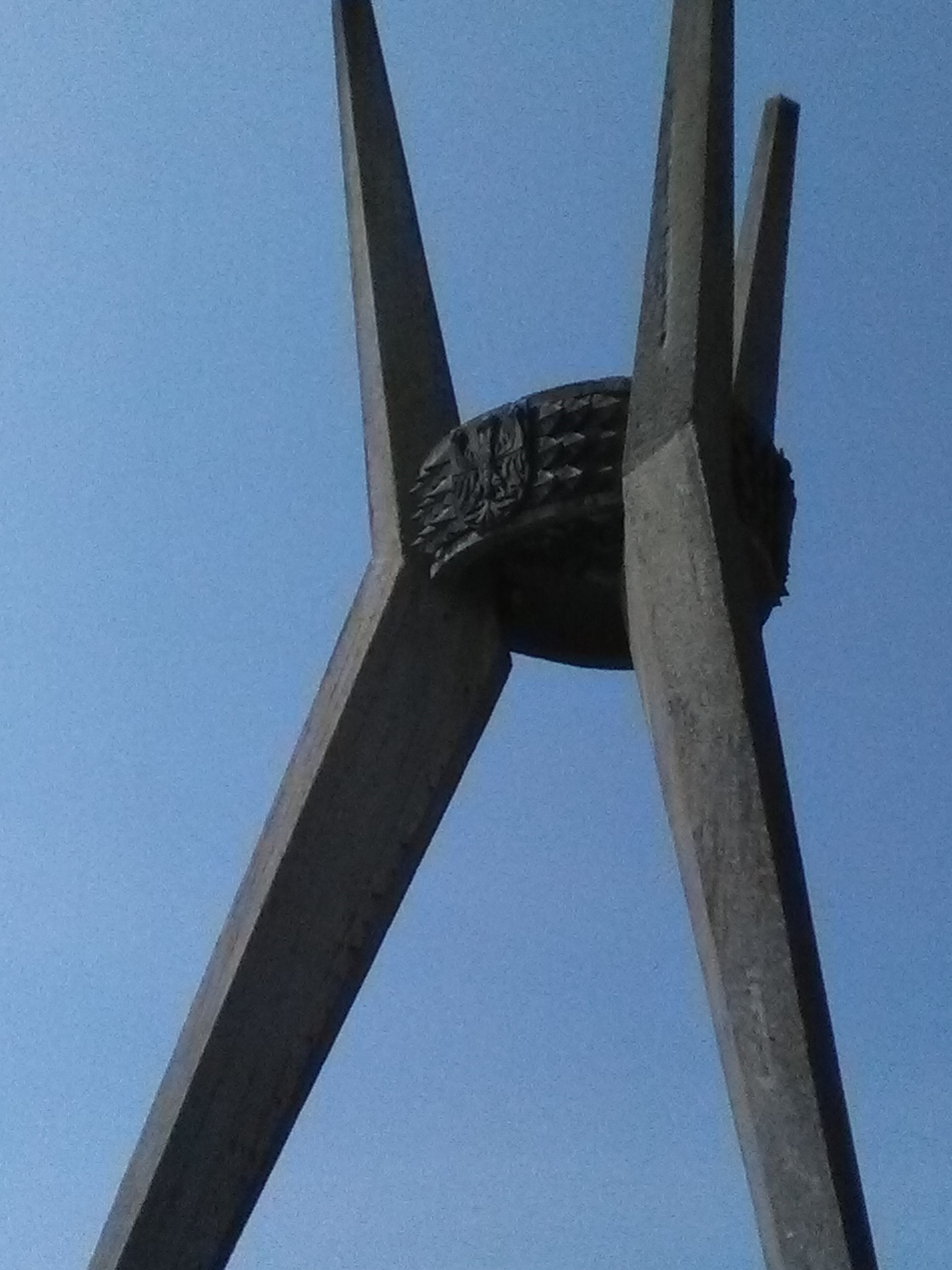
The unachieved monument to the Millennium of the Polish State

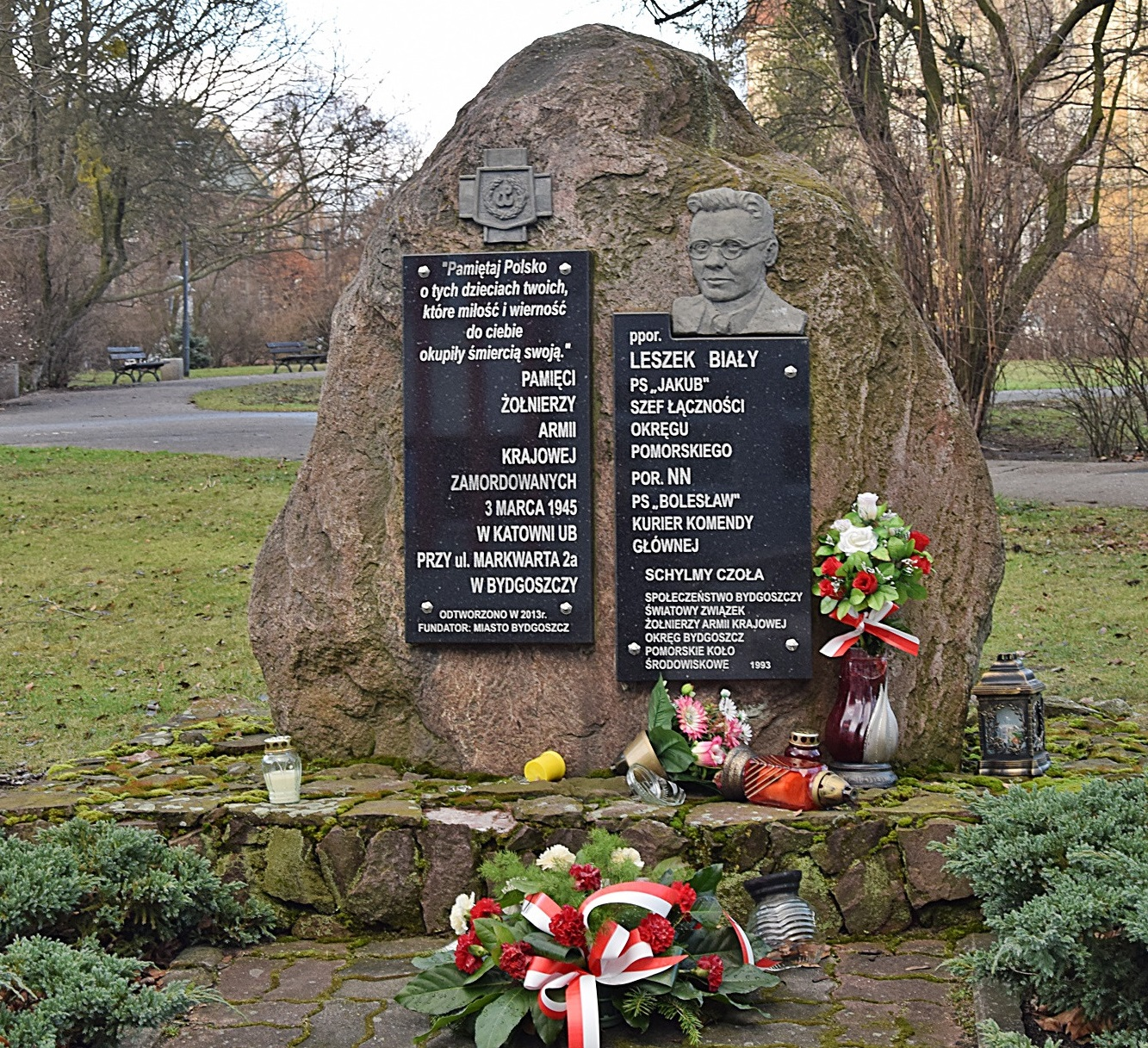
The stone memorial

==== Mikołaja Kopernika Square ====
Kopernika Square is a green area landscaped in 1973. Its statuary includes a metal sculpture of a female figure by Maria Chudoba-Wiśniewska, a mid-20th century sculptor of Poznań. The sculpture weighs 864 kg and is 4,57m tall. The sculpture was erected during the National Open Air Sculpture Festival (Ogólnopolski Plener Rzeźbiarski) which took place from August to September, 1973. Round shaped stones can be found on the grass, positioned on ellipse rings surrounding the statue: they represent the astronomical objects of the Solar System in orbit, including the Sun and the Moon.

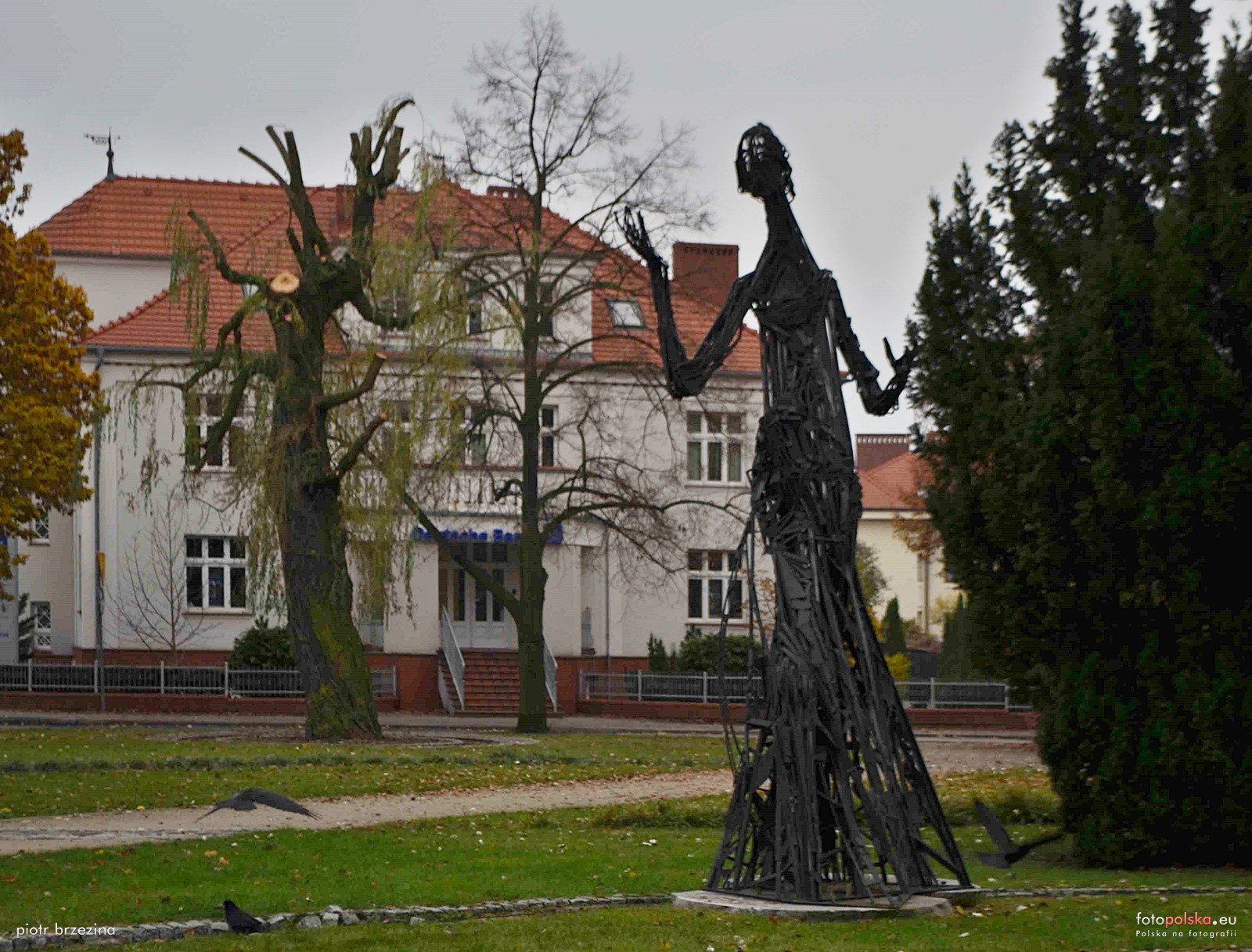
Statue in Kopernika Square

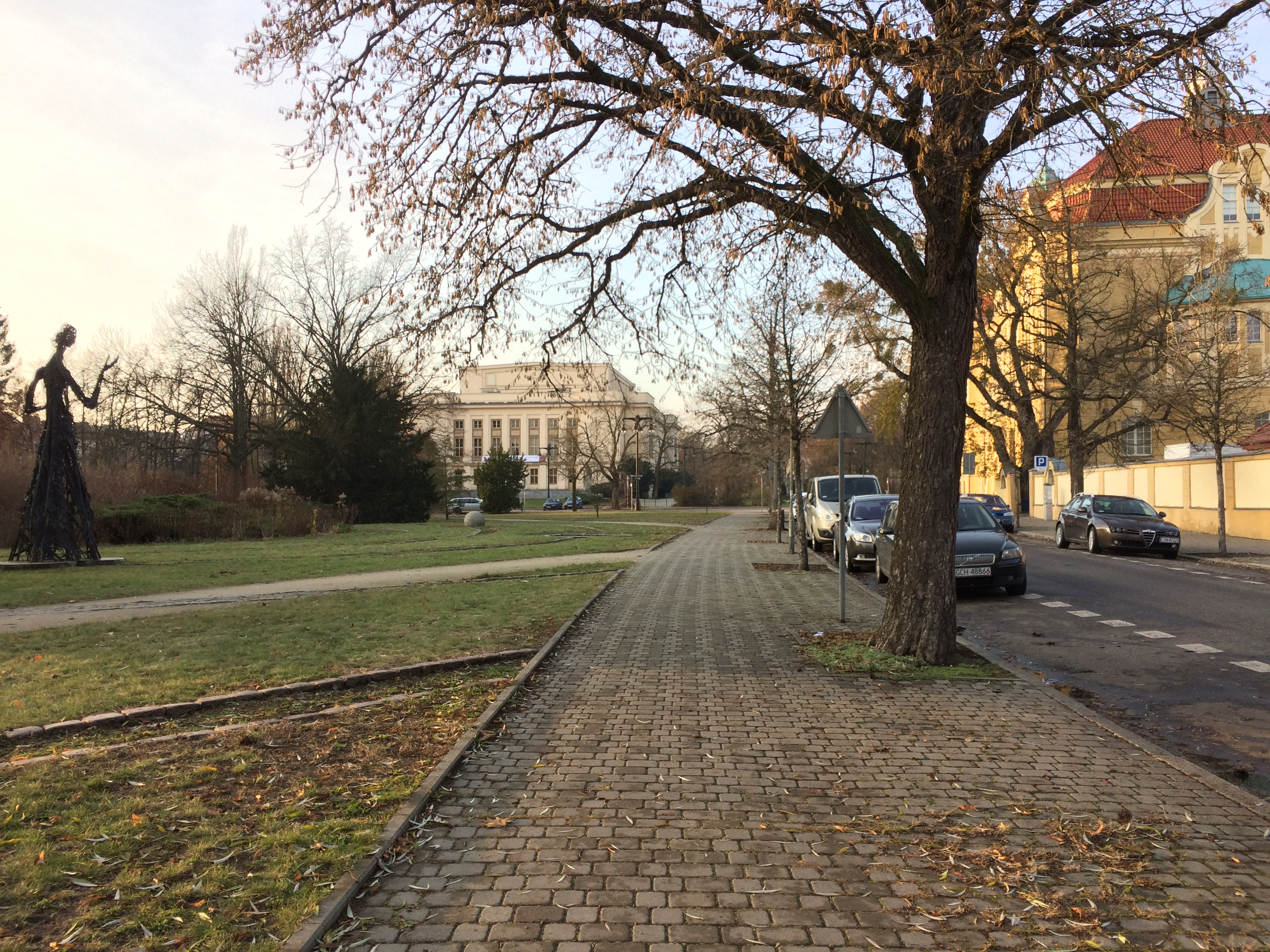
Ellipse rings with round stones on Kopernika Square

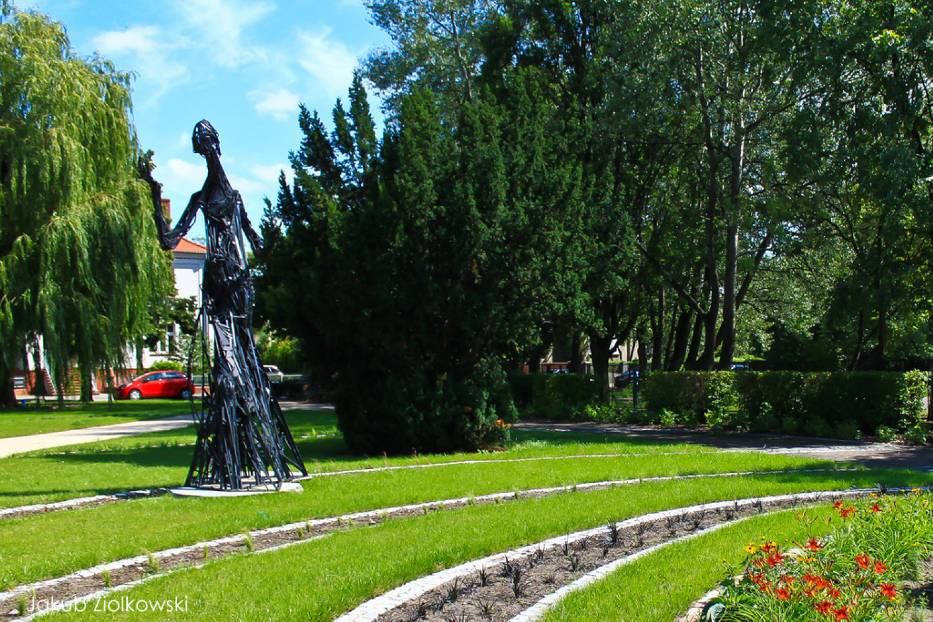
Kopernika Square in summer

== See also ==
- Bydgoszcz
- Bydgoszcz Architects (1850-1970s)
- Copernicanum building in Bydgoszcz
- Institutes of Agriculture of Bydgoszcz
- Saint Vincent de Paul Basilica

== Bibliography ==
- (in Polish) Derkowska-Kostkowska, Bogna (1999). o zalozeniu Sielanki-bydgoskiego miasta ogrodu. Materialy do Dziejów Kultury i Sztuki Bydgoszczy i Regionu. zeszyt 4 (in Polish). Bydgoszcz: Pracownia Dokumentacji i Popularyzacji Zabytków Wojewódzkiego Osrodka Kultury w Bydgoszczy. pp. 72–85.
- (in Polish) Wysocka Agnieszka, Daria Bręczewska-Kulesza (2003). Wille na Sielance. Kronika Bydgoska Zeszyt 25 (in Polish). Bydgoszcz: Towarzystwo Miłosnikow Miasta Bydgoszczy - Bydgoskie Towarzystwo Naukowe. p. 57.
