= Sielanka Street in Bydgoszcz =

Road in Bydgoszcz, Poland

Coordinates: 53°07′37″N 18°00′52″E

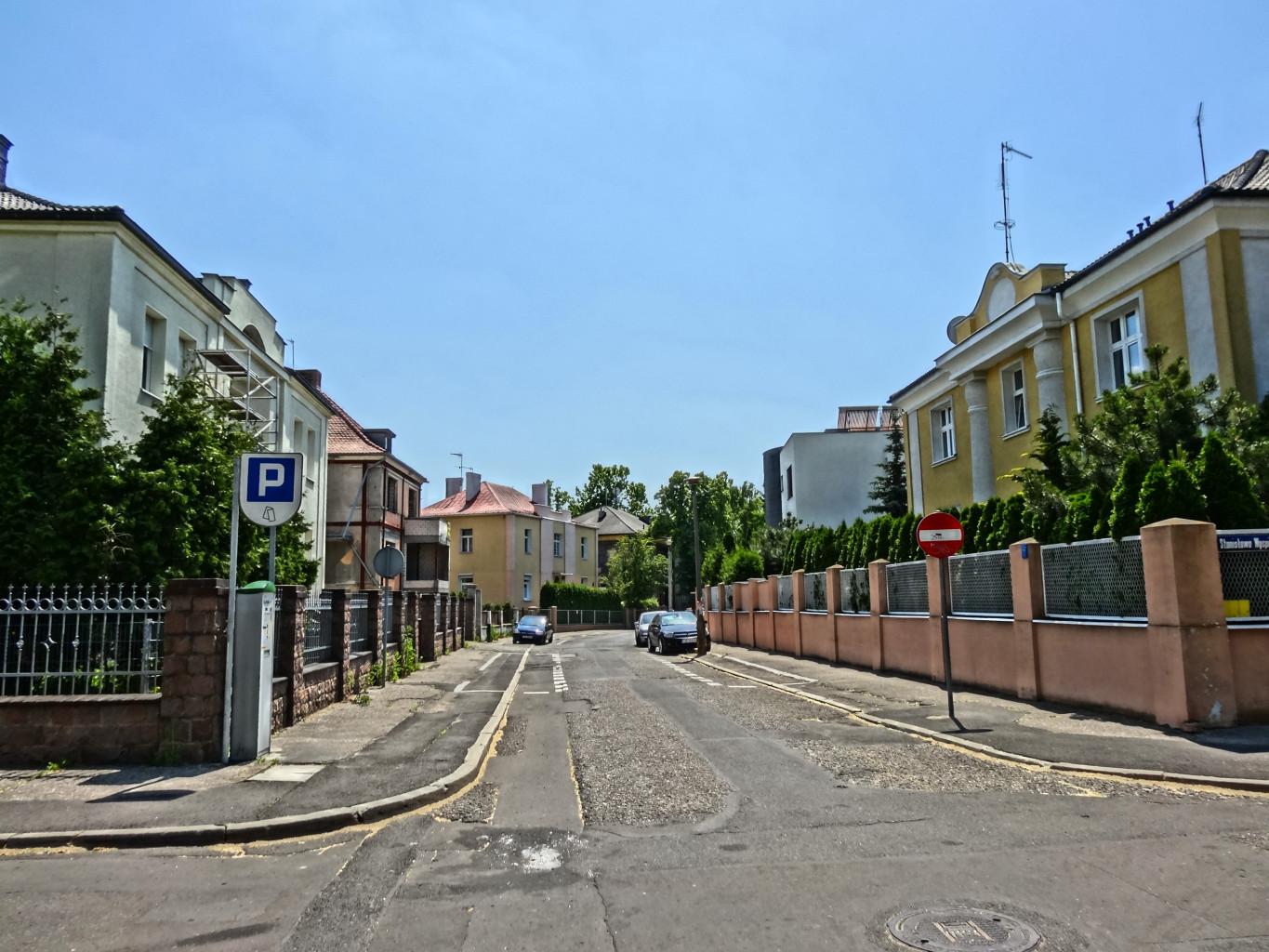
- View of the street to the south
- Interactive map of Sielanka Street in Bydgoszcz
- Native name: Ulica Sielanka w Bydgoszczy (Polish)
- Former names: Eigenheim Straße, Mackensen Straße
- Part of: Śródmieście district
- Namesake: Sielanka (English: Idyll)
- Owner: City of Bydgoszcz
- Length: 230 m (750 ft)
- Width: ca. 10m
- Location: Bydgoszcz, Poland

Construction
- Construction start: Mid-1910s

Sielanka Street is a small and twisty road, laid in the mid-1910s in downtown Bydgoszcz. It displays a series of villas, each of which is unique in its architectural concept.

== Location ==
Sielanka street is located in the Śródmieście (downtown) district. Its short path interlaces with three other streets in the area: from its southern tip at Markwarta street, it crosses Stanisława Wyspiańskiego street and ends, after a western bend along Marian Turwid square, at Czesława Miłosza street.

== History ==
In the early 20th century, in then Bromberg, a large distinct area was being developed east of the town centre. Delineated by today's Ossoliński Alley, Adam Mickiewicz Alley and Markwarta, Paderewskiego and Staszica streets, the area laid north of a Protestant cemetery which became Ludowy Park, on Jagiellońska street.

This triangular area was then further developed as the Sielanka estate (English: Idyll). Based on an initial design by Josef Stübben (1845 – 1936), the project was led by urban engineer Heinrich Metzger and surveyor Bernhard Hirsch. Sielanka street is patently at the heart of this estate.

The area was initially known by its plaza (today's Marian Turwid square), which was developed under the following names:

- Eigenheim Platz (English: Home square), in the mid-1910s;
- Mackensen Platz from 1917 to 1920, referring to August von Mackensen (1849–1945), a German field marshal.

Once the street started to be laid out, it bore different names, pending the local ruling authorities:

- Ulica Sielanka (1920–1939);
- Mackensen Straße during the German occupation (1939–1945),
- Ulica Sielanka since 1945.

As mentioned, the current naming relates to the early 1910s project of the Sielanka estate in Bydgoszcz.

== Main areas and edifices ==
=== Villa at 1, corner with Markwarta street ===
1930-1933

Early Functionalism, by Bolesław Polakiewicz

The initial landlord was registered as Ludwik Biały, a sworn auditor, who, at the time, had access to his private phone line. Ludwik is the father of Leszek Biały, a Polish hero of the Home Army during the Second World War, whose name has been given to a nearby square in Sielanka. In April 2020, the villa has been razed down by decision of the city authorities. The building had been actually in a very bad shape for many years, cracked in its foundations and only held by clamps. A private investor will finally reconstruct this villa to its initial architectural state.

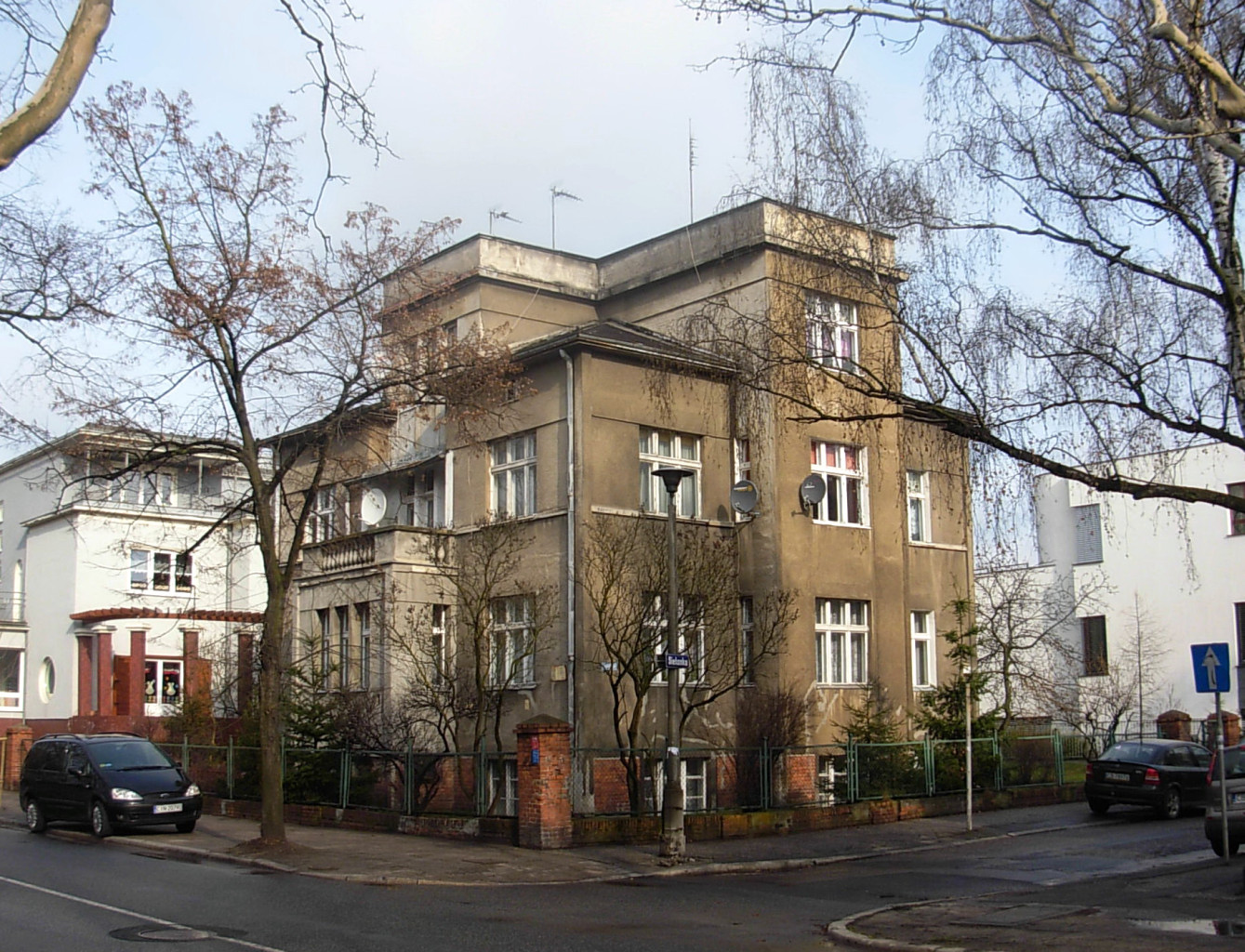
View from Markwarta street before demolition

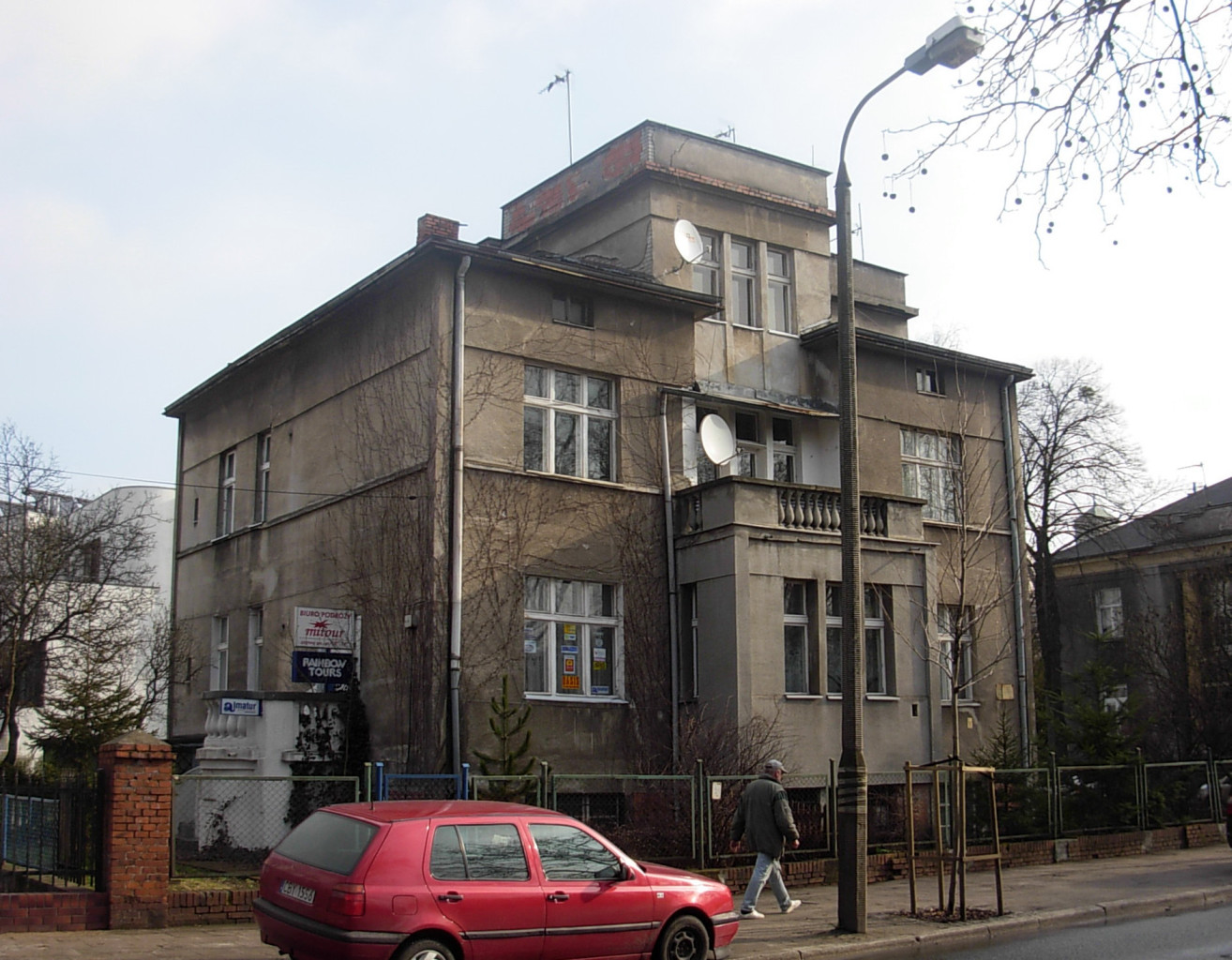
View from Markwarta street before demolition

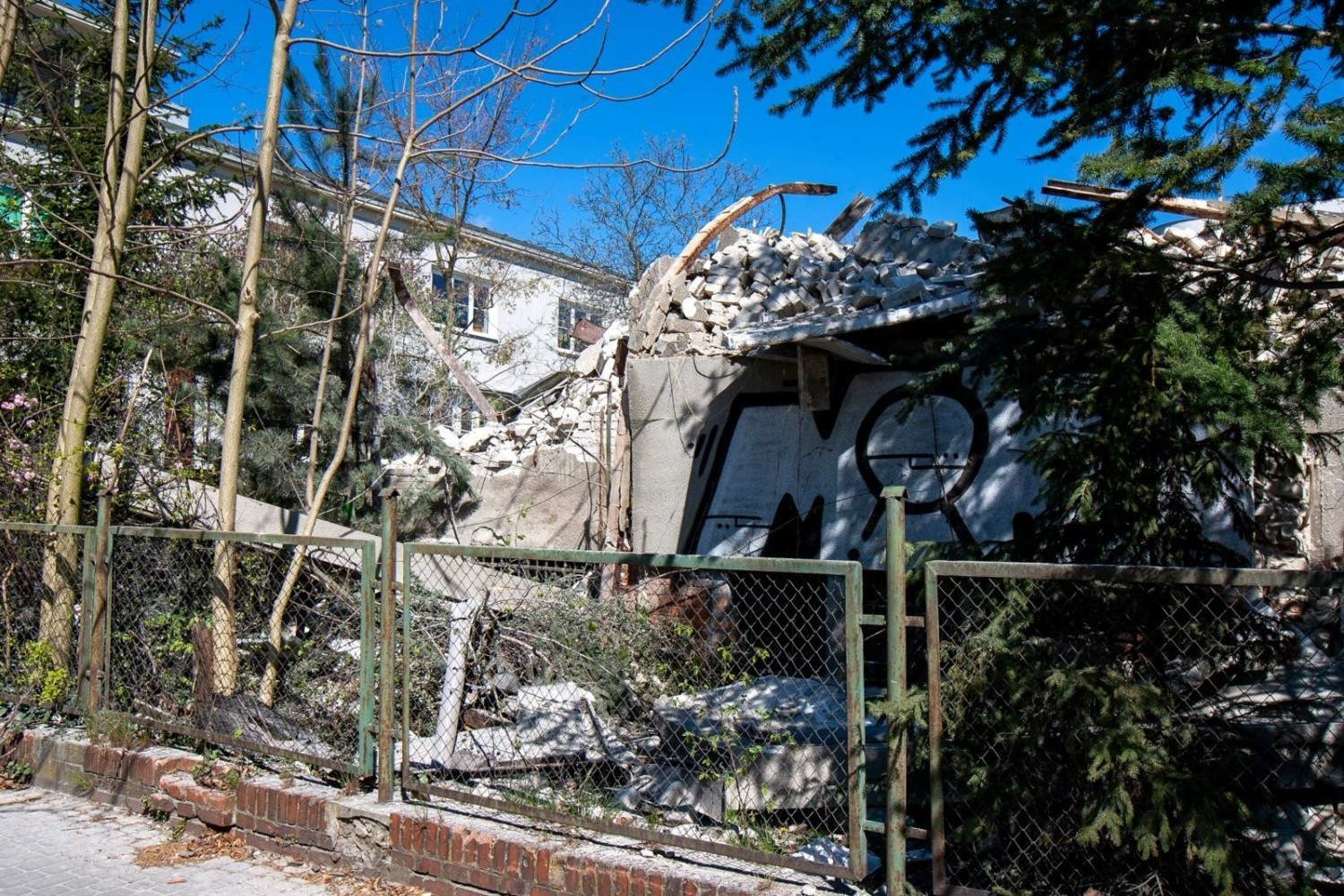
Razing in progress

=== Villa at 2, corner with Markwarta street ===
1927–1928, by Bronisław Jankowski

Early Modernism

Its first owner, Artur Zaborowski or Zborowoski, was not living there, but at 11 Kwiatowa street, further west in the downtown district. He was working as a book seller.

The villa's modernist features are soothed by additions on the elevations: a round avant-corps topped by a terrace with balustrade and a grand portal, flanked by columns, with a French windowed balcony overlooking the main entrance.

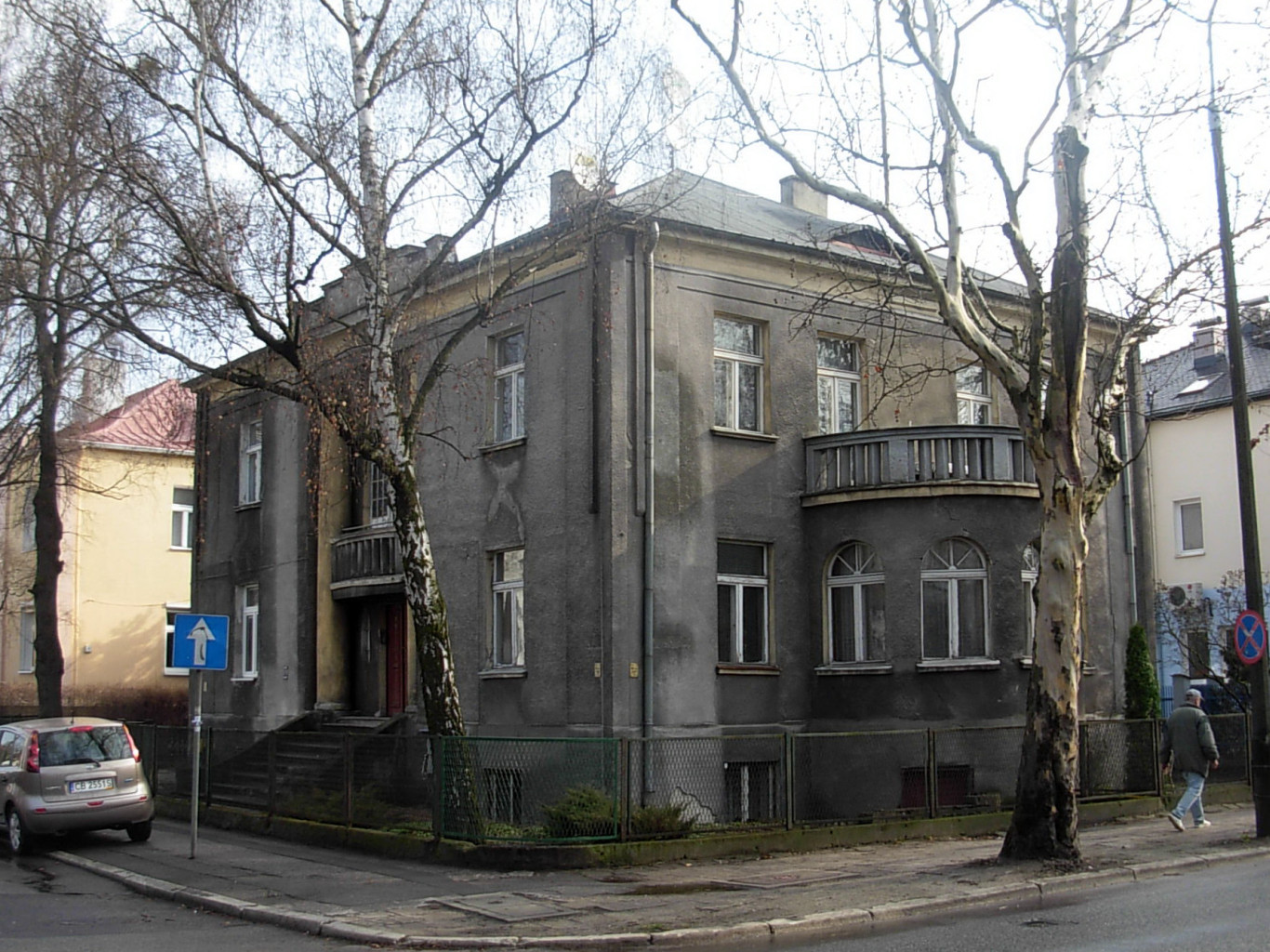
View from Markwarta street

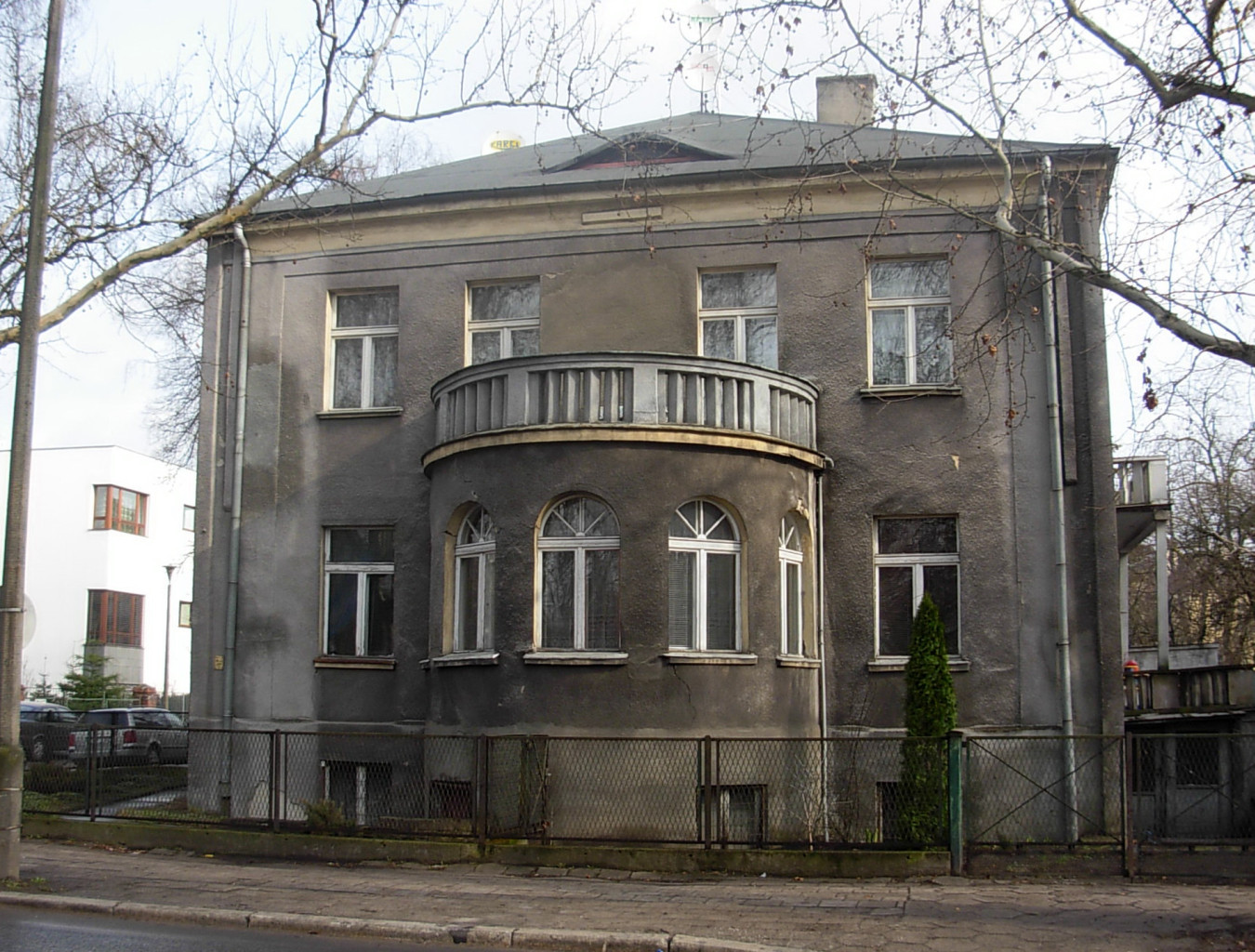
Frontage onto Markwarta street

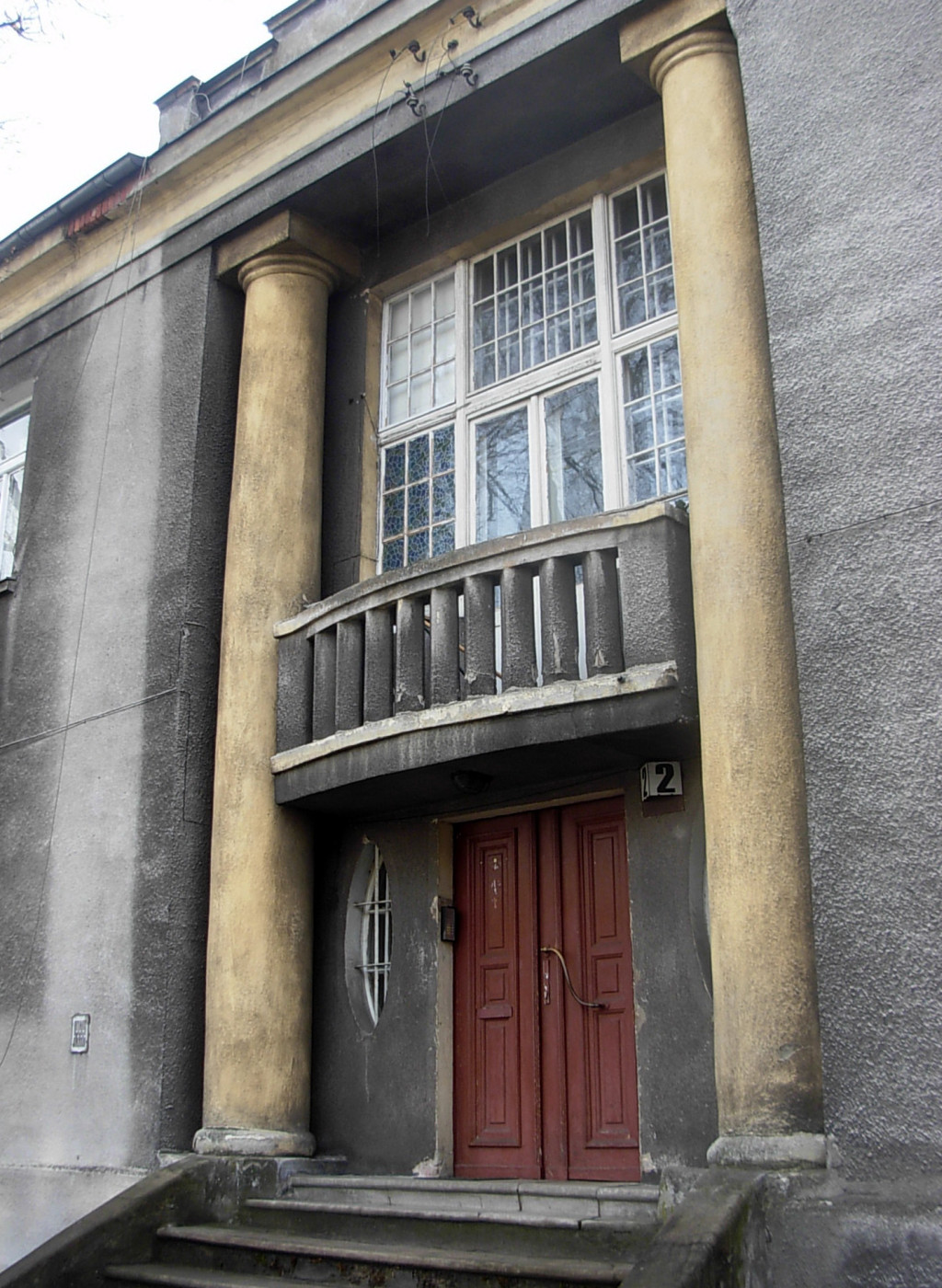
Portal onto Sielanka street

=== Villa at 3 ===
1934-1935 by Bronisław Jankowski

Modernism

Architect Bronisław Jankowski, though the first registered owner of this villa, never inhabited here.

The restored house displays two modernist habitation blocks articulated with a round avant-corps harbouring the staircase. The external flight of stairs from the outside also clutches to this circular shape.

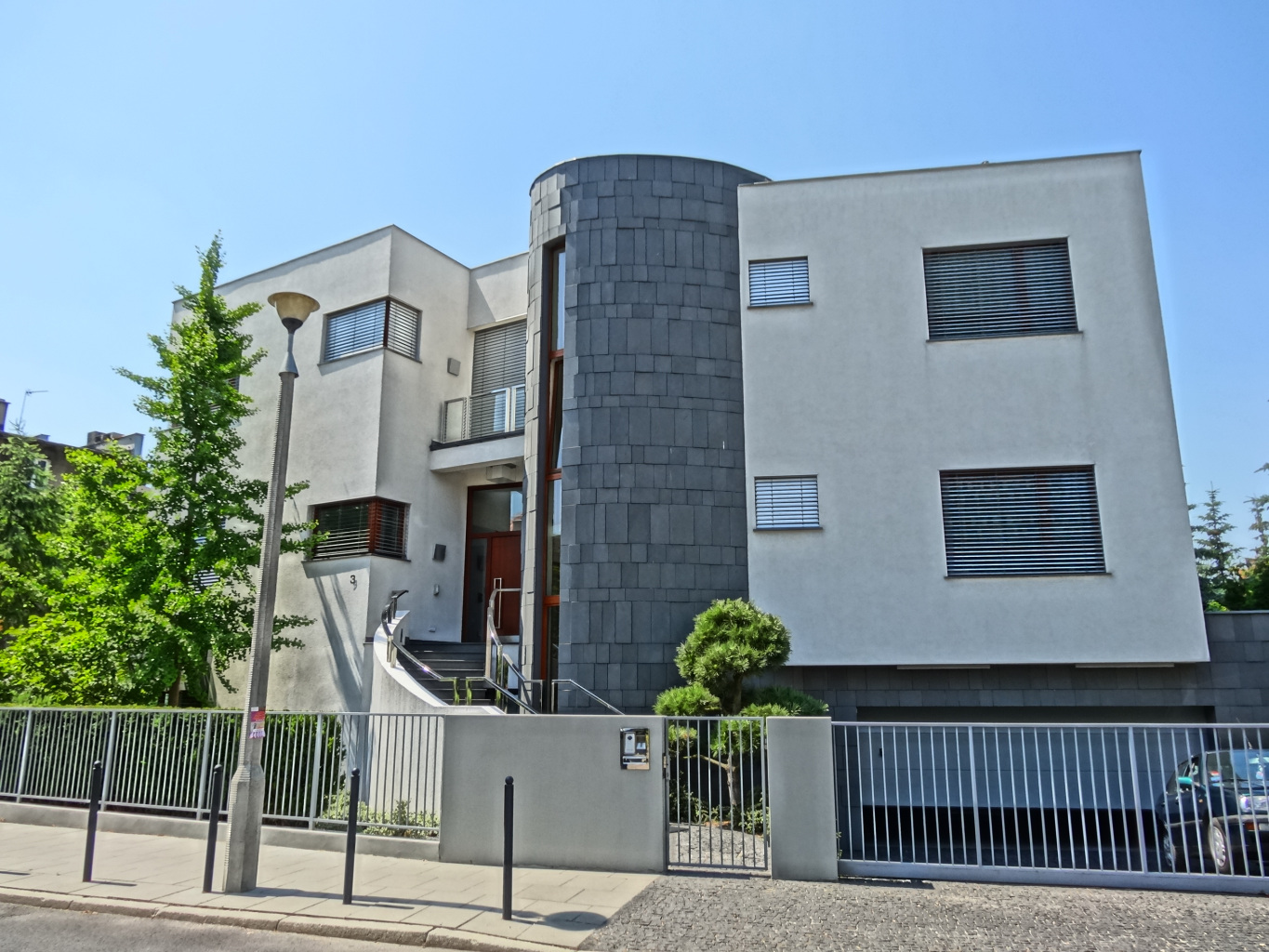
View from the street

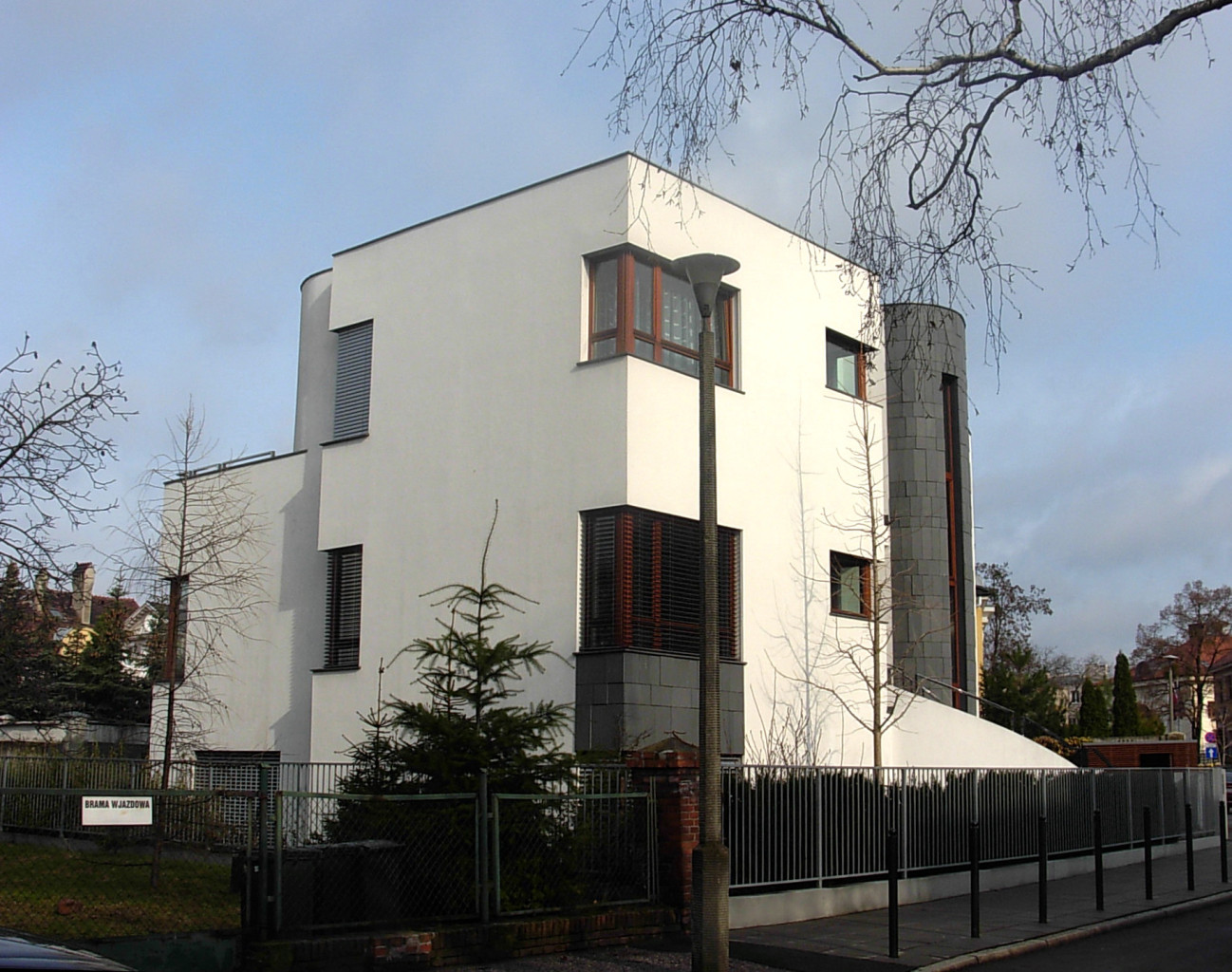
View of the southern facade

=== Villa at 4 ===
1927–1930, by Bronisław Jankowski

Early Modernism

Rafał Kuklińscy, the first landlord, did not inhabit the villa nor was living in Bydgoszcz area, according to the address registries.

The structure of the house is somehow conventional for the modernist 1930s. One can highlight the half-moon avant-corps with terrace that hangs over the back garden.

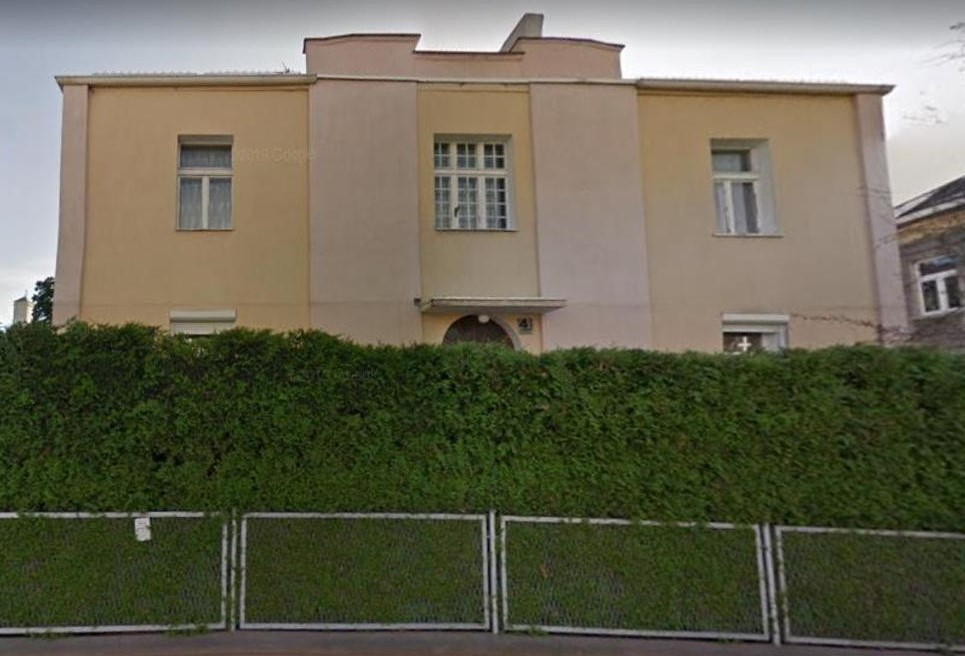
Elevation onto the street

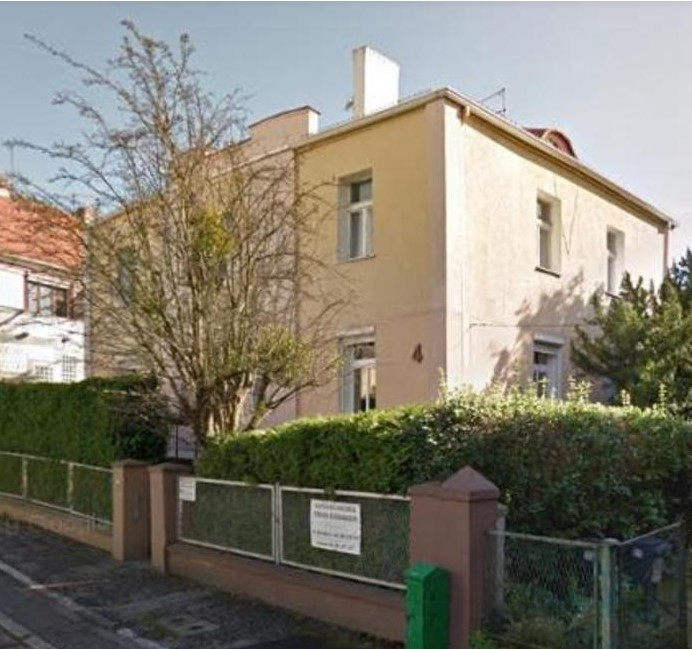
View of the southwestern corner

=== Gustaw Bernaczek Villa at 8, corner with Wyspiańskiego street ===
1927–1929, by Bronisław Jankowski

Modernism, Polish National Style

Villa commissioner, Gustaw Bernaczek, an engineer, was the manager of a factory at 46 Gdańska Street, which was still labelled as 147 Danziger straße. He was still a lieutenant in the military at the beginning of the 1920s, living at today's 16 20 Stycznia 1920 Street. Marian Turwid, a Polish writer, painter and cultural activist, lived there from the end of WWII till his demise.

This large villa, boasts an impressive portal, flanked by columns, topped by a balcony, mirroring the edifice at Nr.2. Albeit, architectural details are more developed here, with a semi-circular window opening crowning the main facade and building extensions with terraces on the other elevations.

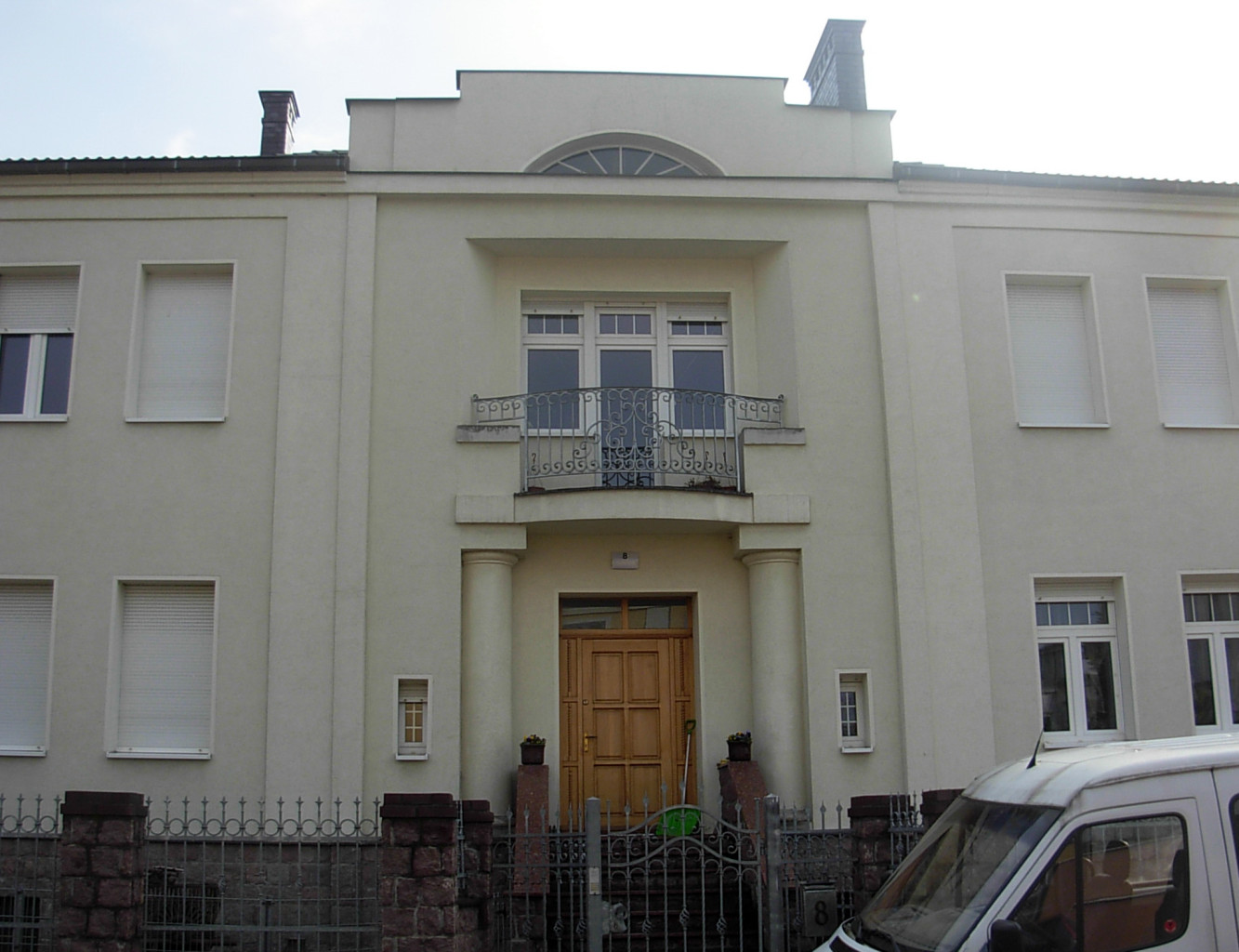
Elevation onto the street

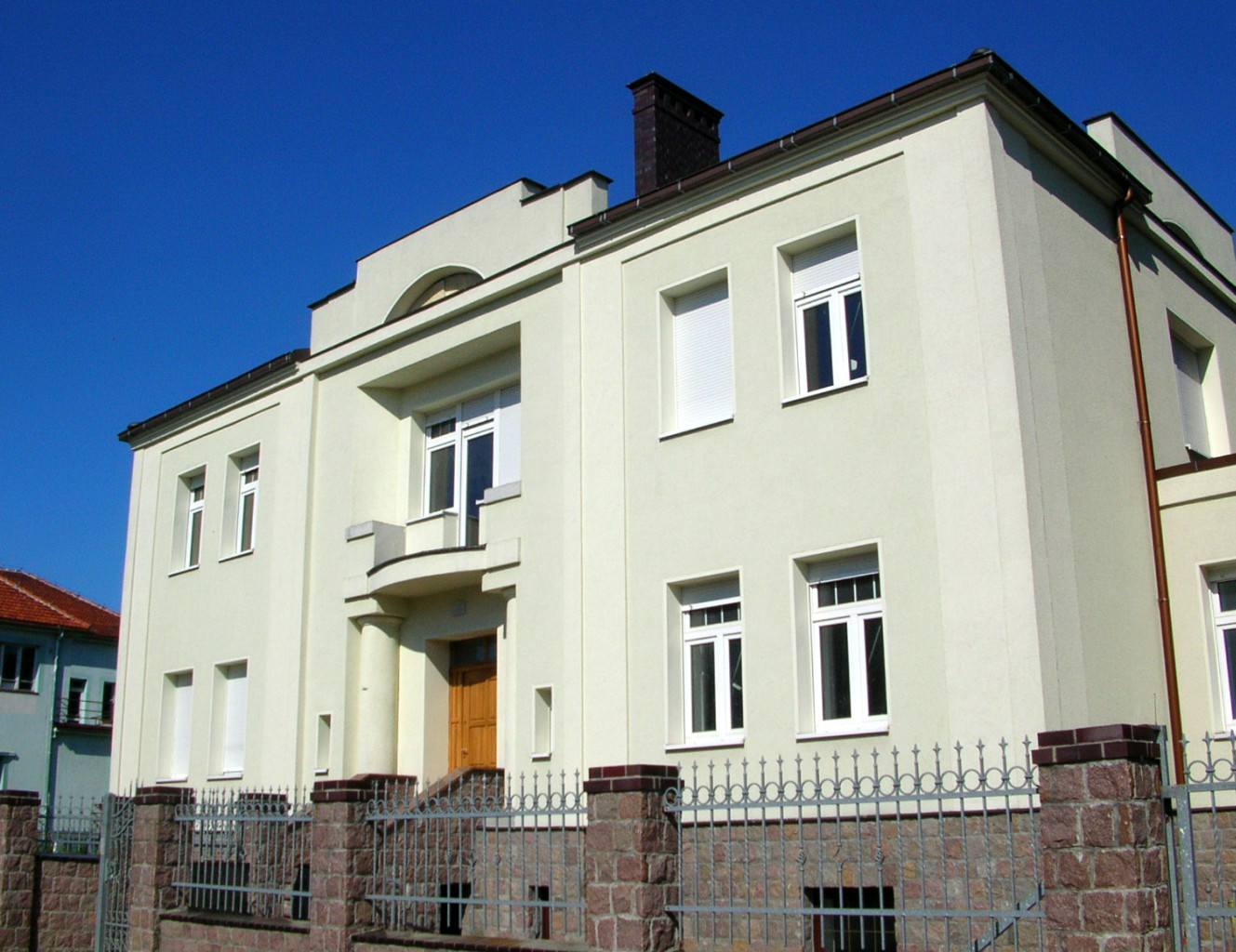
View of the southwestern corner

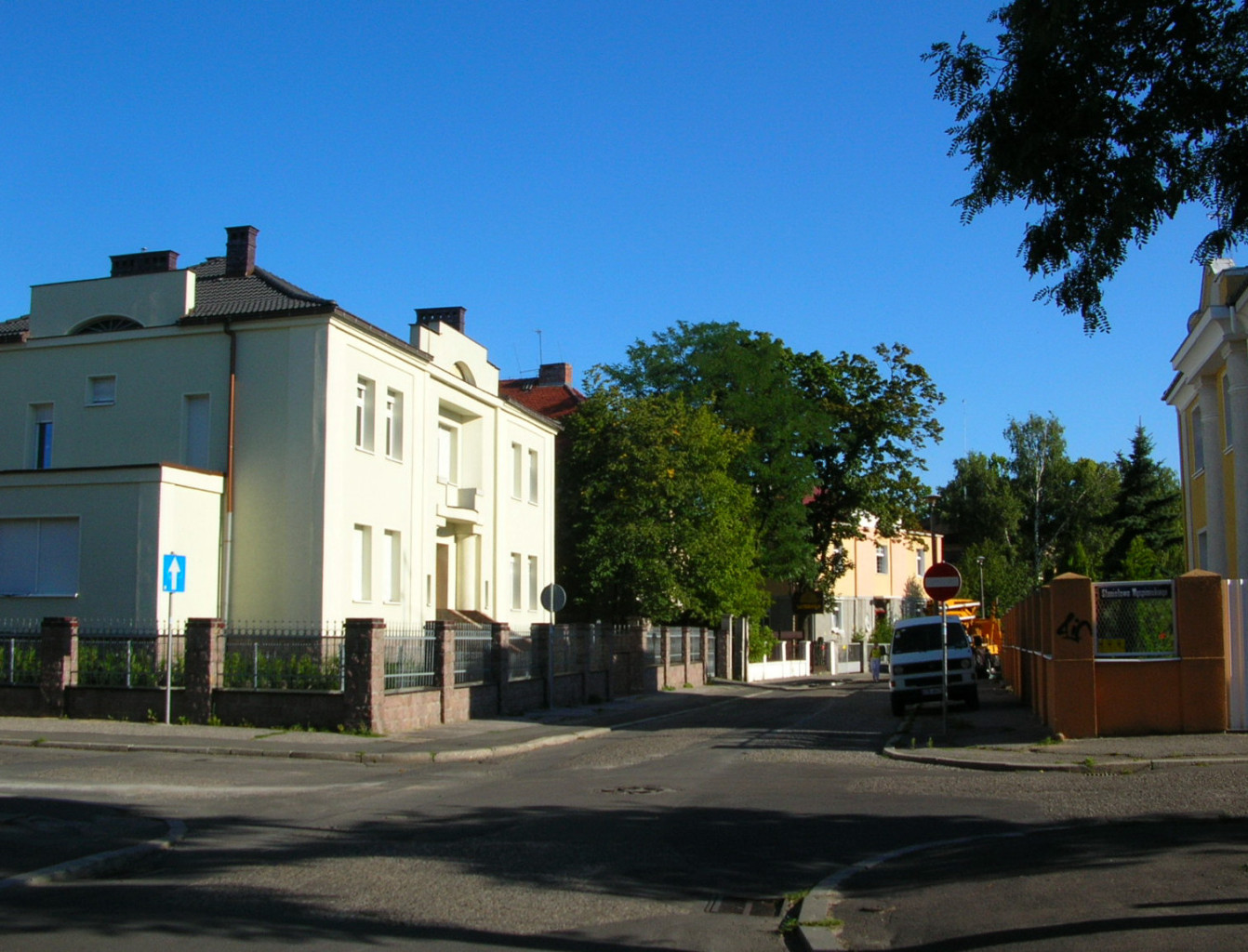
Bernaczek Villa (left), house at 10 Wyspiańskiego (right)

=== Villa at 10 Wyspiańskiego street, corner with Sielanka street ===
1927-1929

Modernism, Polish National Style

Dr. Kazimierz Panek, a professor at the university, was the first landlord of the house.

This large square edifice echoes the villa at the opposing side, with some deviations. One can notice on the facade giving onto Silanka street an entry flanked by columns supporting a lintel and a pediment. The main elevation on Wyspiańskiego street is more modest, although displaying a nice transom light door highlighted by pilasters and wall lesenes.

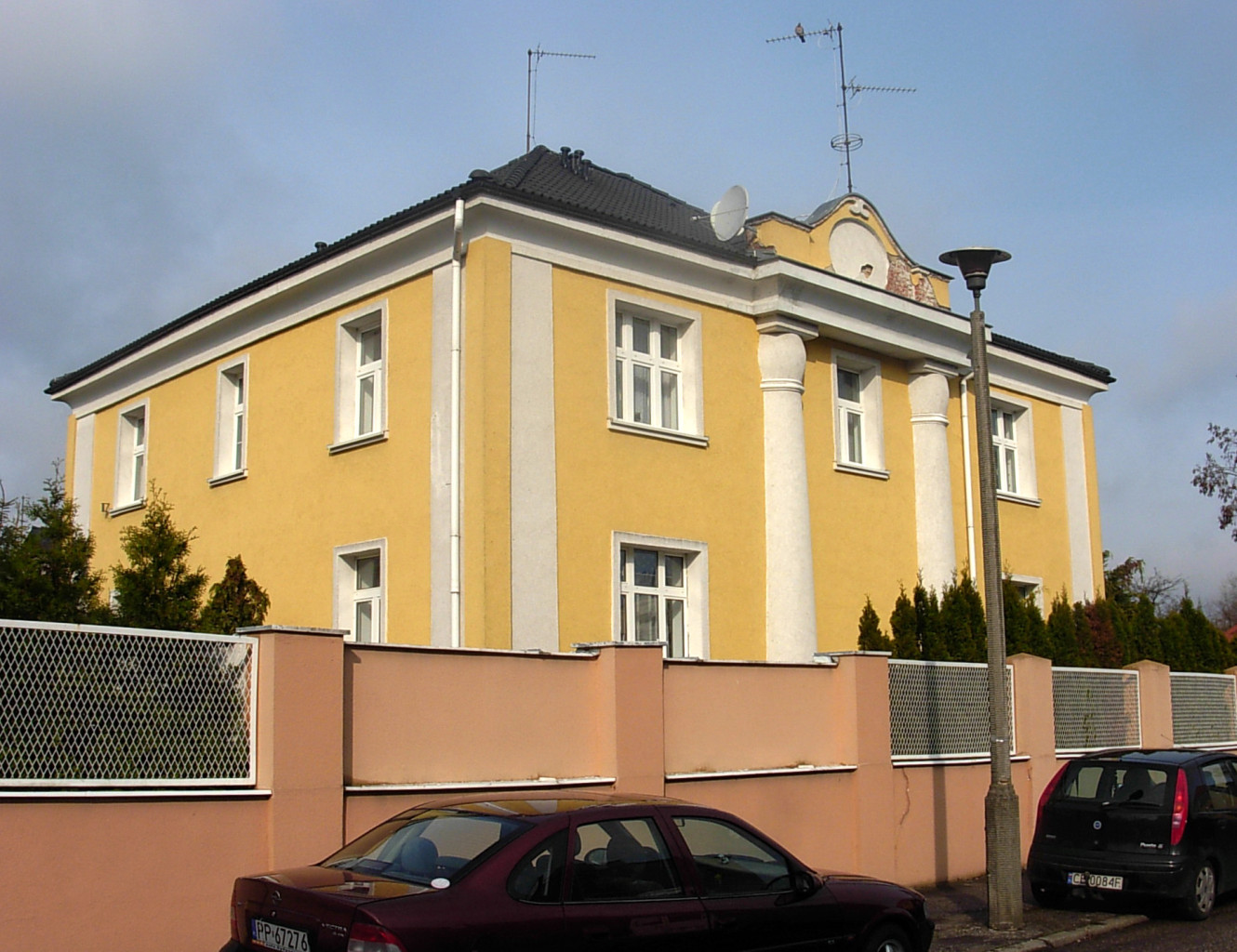
Elevation on Sielanka street

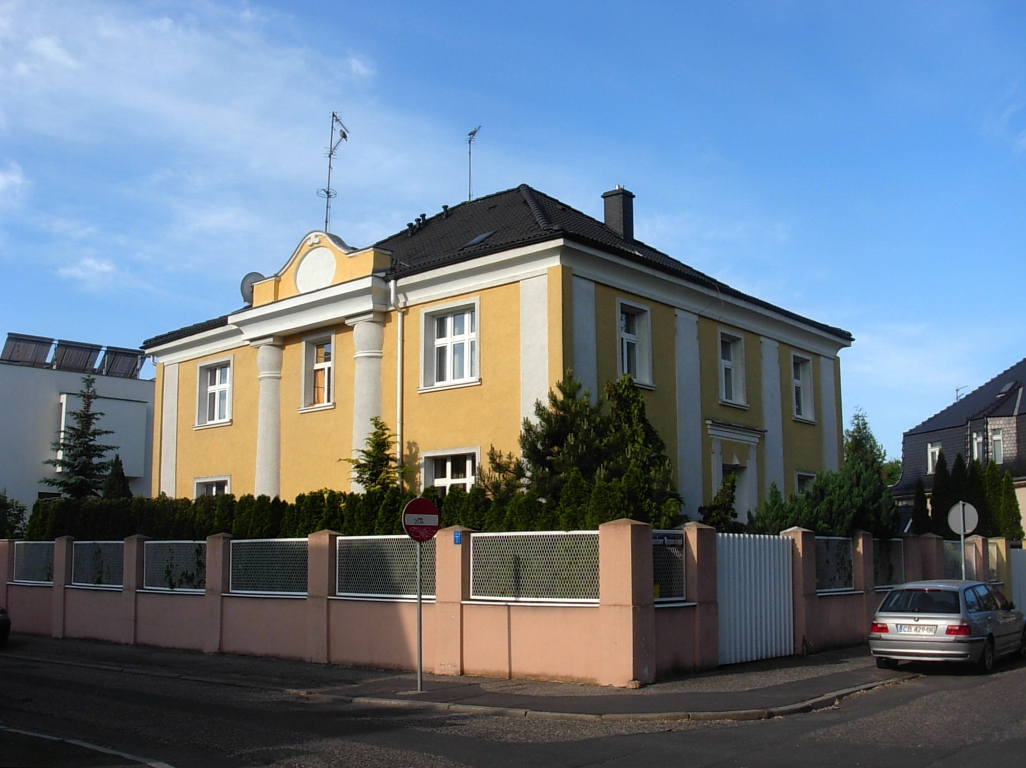
View from the street crossing

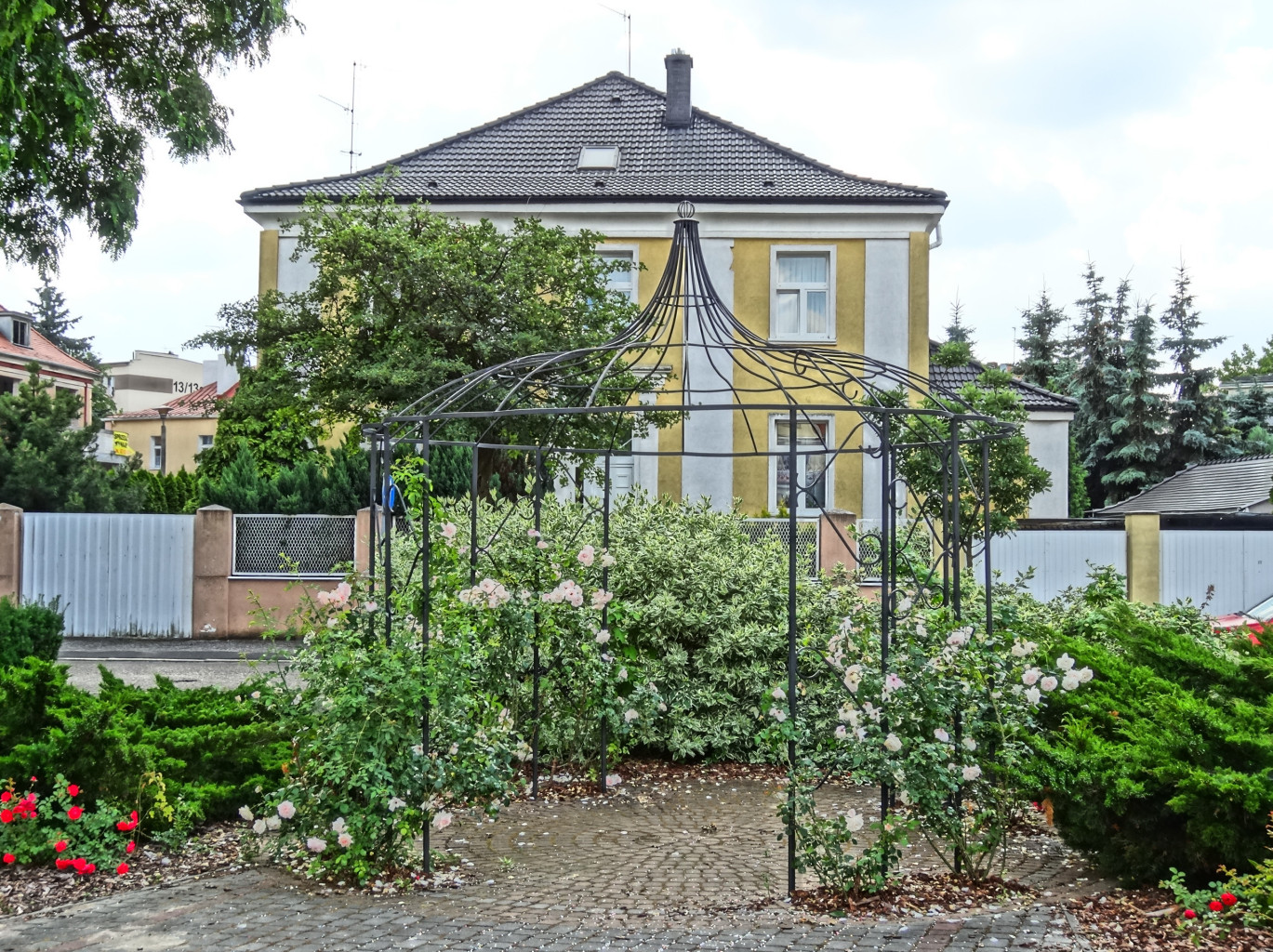
View from Turwid Square

=== Villa at 8a, corner with Wyspiańskiego street ===
1933, by Jan Kossowski

Modernism, elements of Streamline Moderne architecture

The house was initially ordered by Czesław Borys, a merchant, to the architect Jan Kossowski. In the early years of WWII, Werner Kampe, Kreisleiter of the local NSDAP, a SS Hauptsturmführer and a war criminal, rented a flat in this building. Since the end of the War, the villa has been housing the Wedding Registry Office (Polish: Pałac Ślubów - Urząd Stanu Cywilnego).

Renovated in April–May 2009, the large villa faces Marian Turwid square.

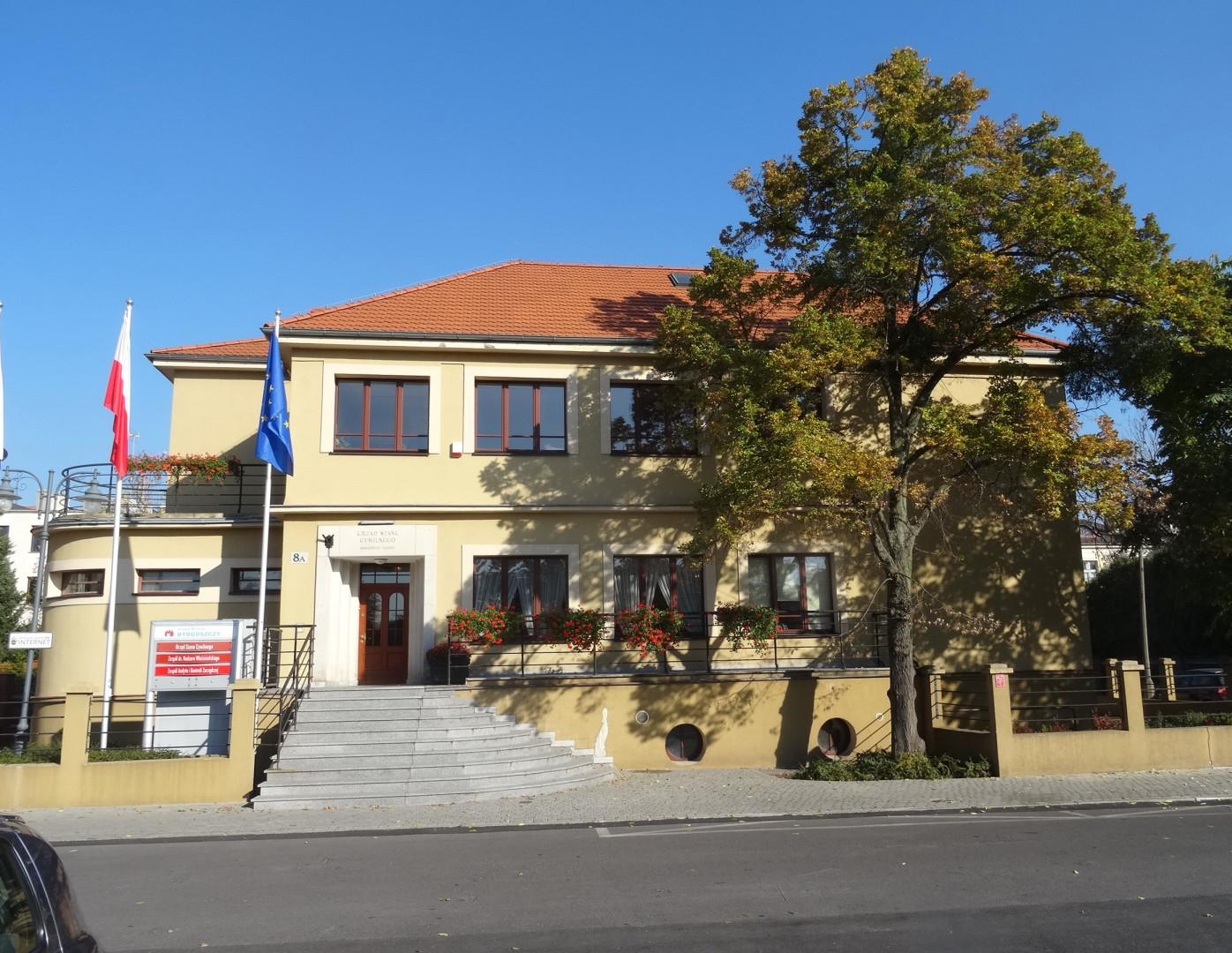
Facade onto the square

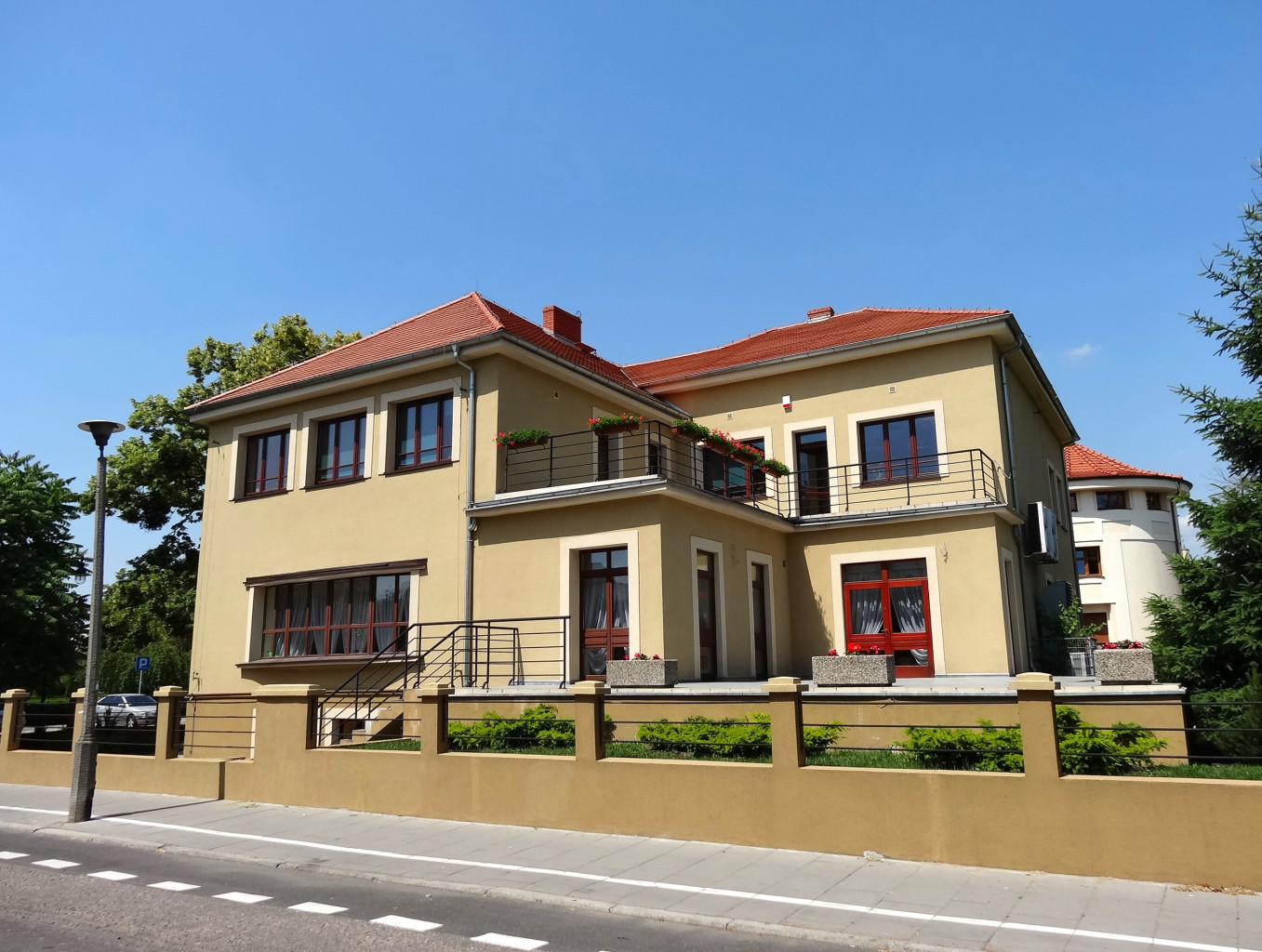
Facade onto Wyspiańskiego street

=== Marian Turwid Square ===
1911

This green area, designed from the start in the Sielanka estate, was the first element of the project to be realized in 1911. Initially named Eigenheim Platz (English: Home square), then Mackensen Platz till the end of the Prussian period of Bydgoszcz (1920), it is located at the heart of Sielanka and covers an area of 0.4 hectares (0.99 acres). The original square design has been modified in 1925, by engineer Marian Guntzl, who created a new garden layout, in the same way as he will design a few years later the city Botanic Garden.

It has been named in reference to Marian Turwid (1905–1987), a Polish writer, painter and cultural activist in Bydgoszcz.

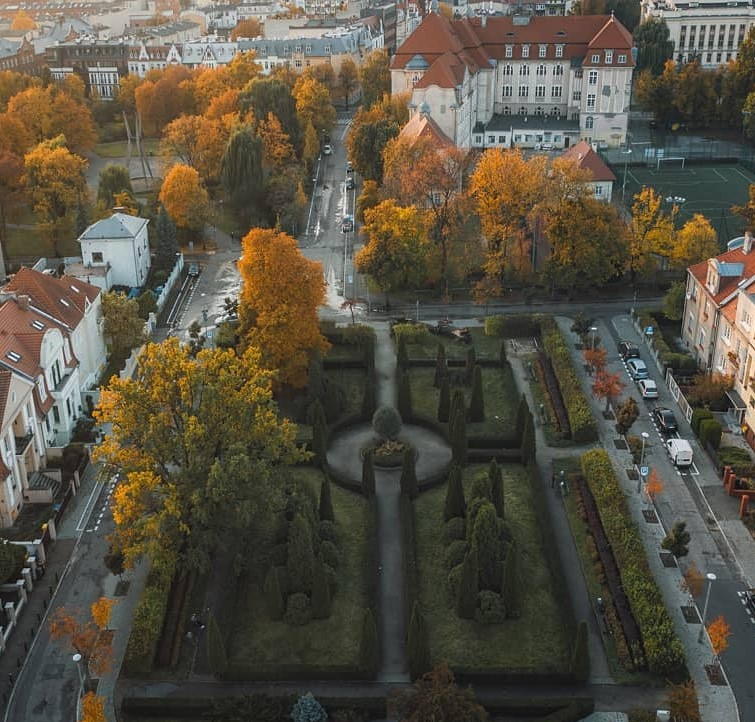
Bird eye view square

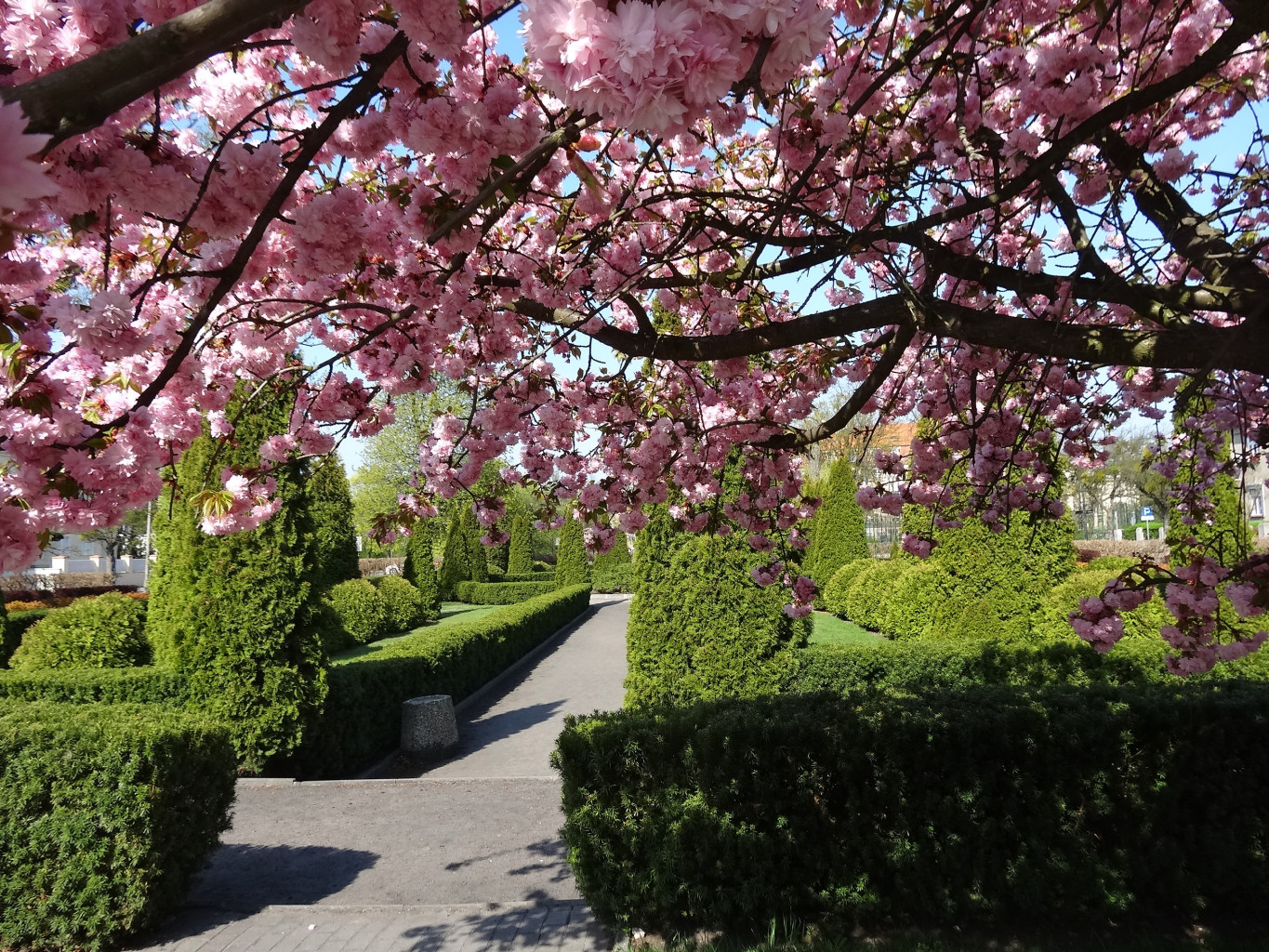
Plaza in springtime

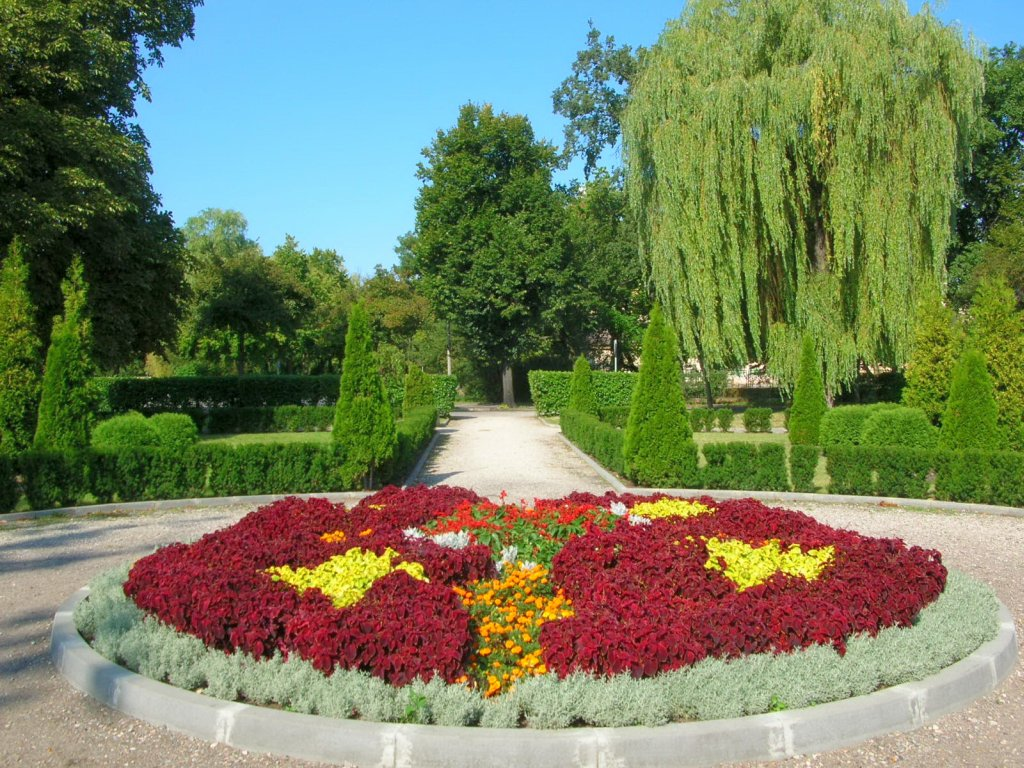
Flowers in summer

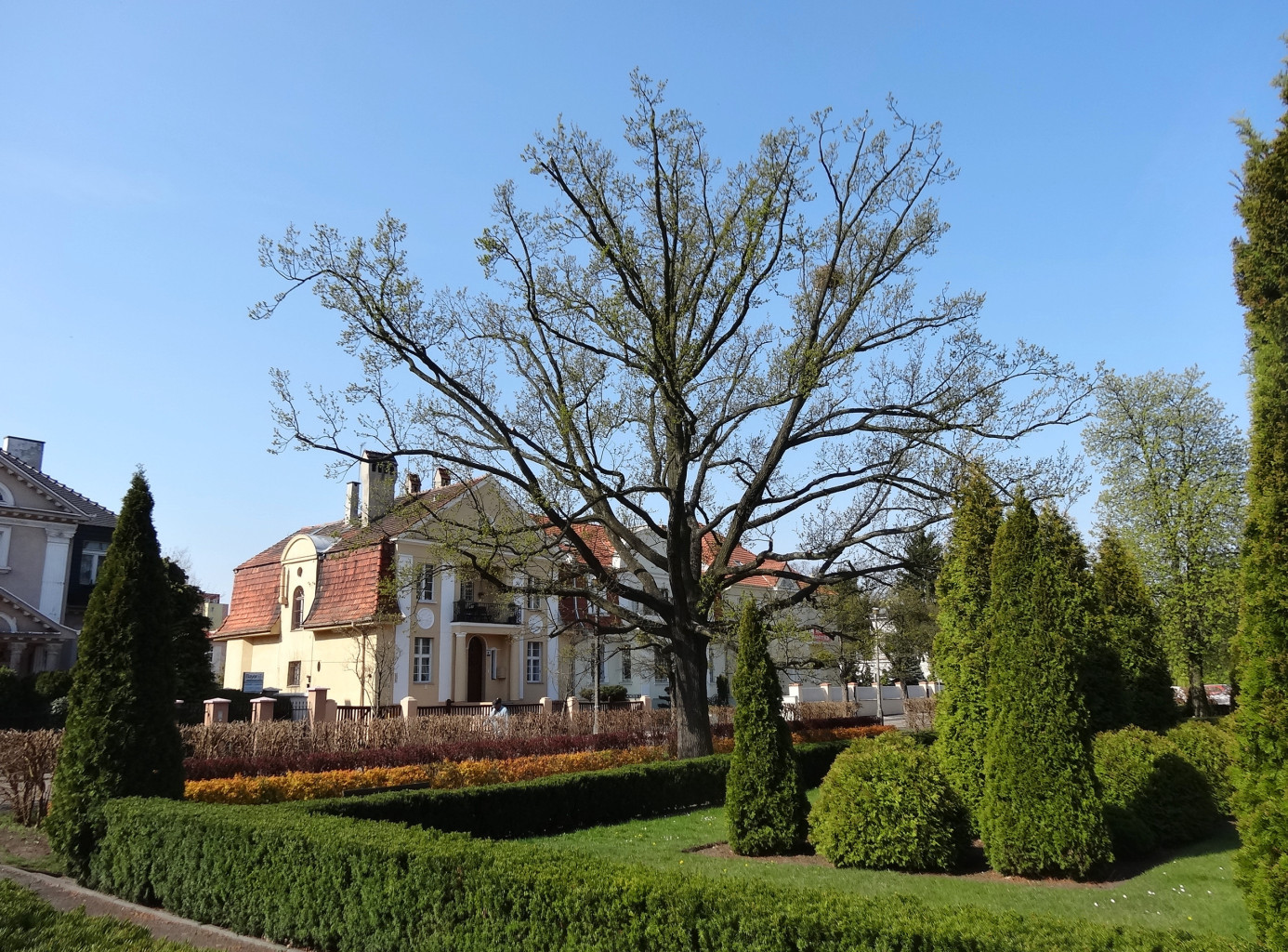
View on Wyspiańskiego street

=== Villa at 10 ===
1927, by Bronisław Jankowski

Early Modernism

The initial address was 5 Ulica Sielanka, following the German house numbering. The first proprietor, Leonja Gałecka, did not live there once constructed: she only moved in a year later (1929).

The villa is the largest in the street, combining a square footprint on the front with an additional quirky back building.

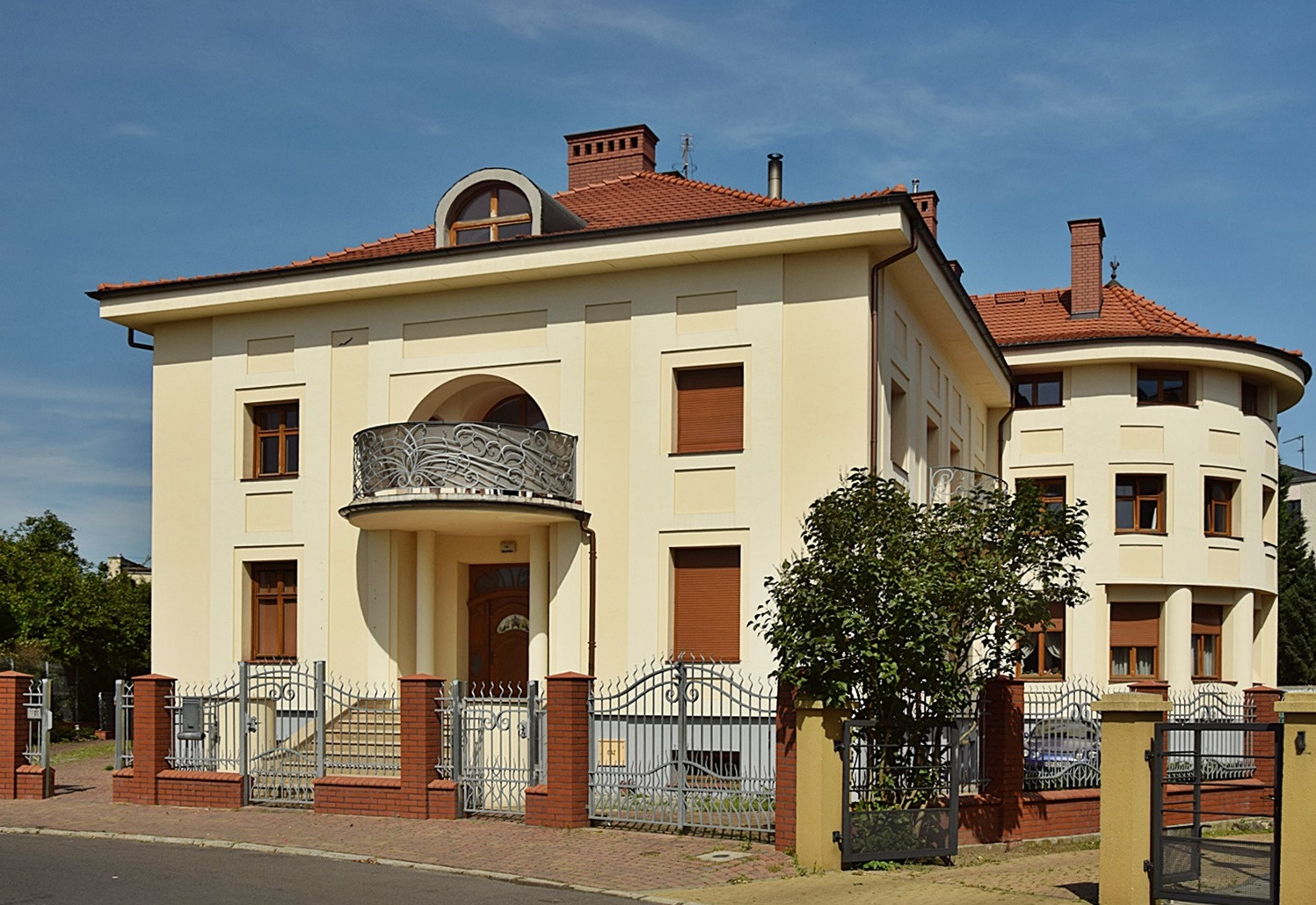
View from Turwid Square

=== Villa at 12 ===
1931-1934

Functionalism

The initial address was 4 Ulica Sielanka: the house first belonged to a physician, Dr. Mieczysław Nowakowski, working for the city of Bydgoszcz.

The villa is representative of the functionalist style, with cube-shaped elements, as one can still find other instances nearby (e.g. along Ossoliński Avenue).

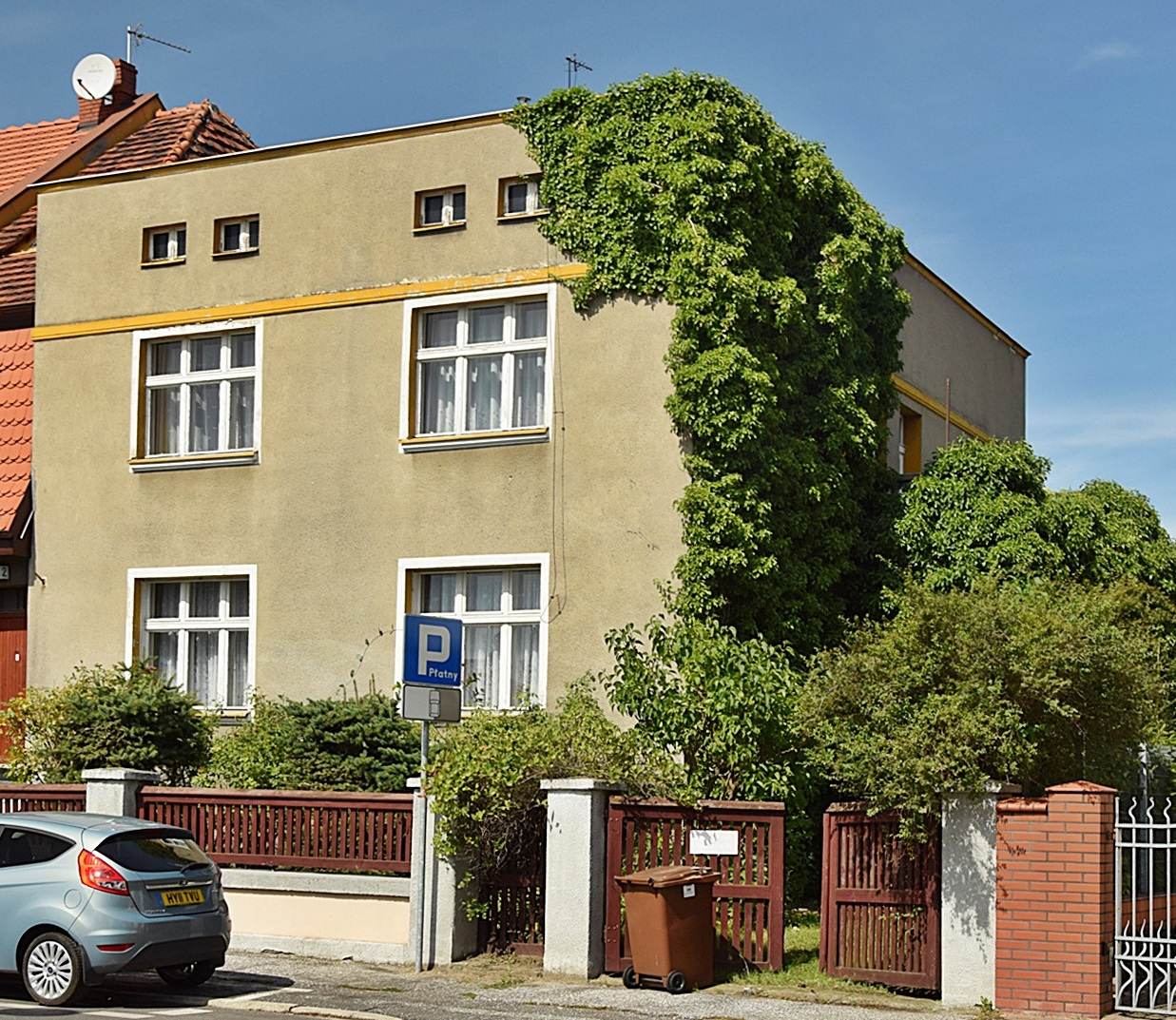
View from Turwid Square

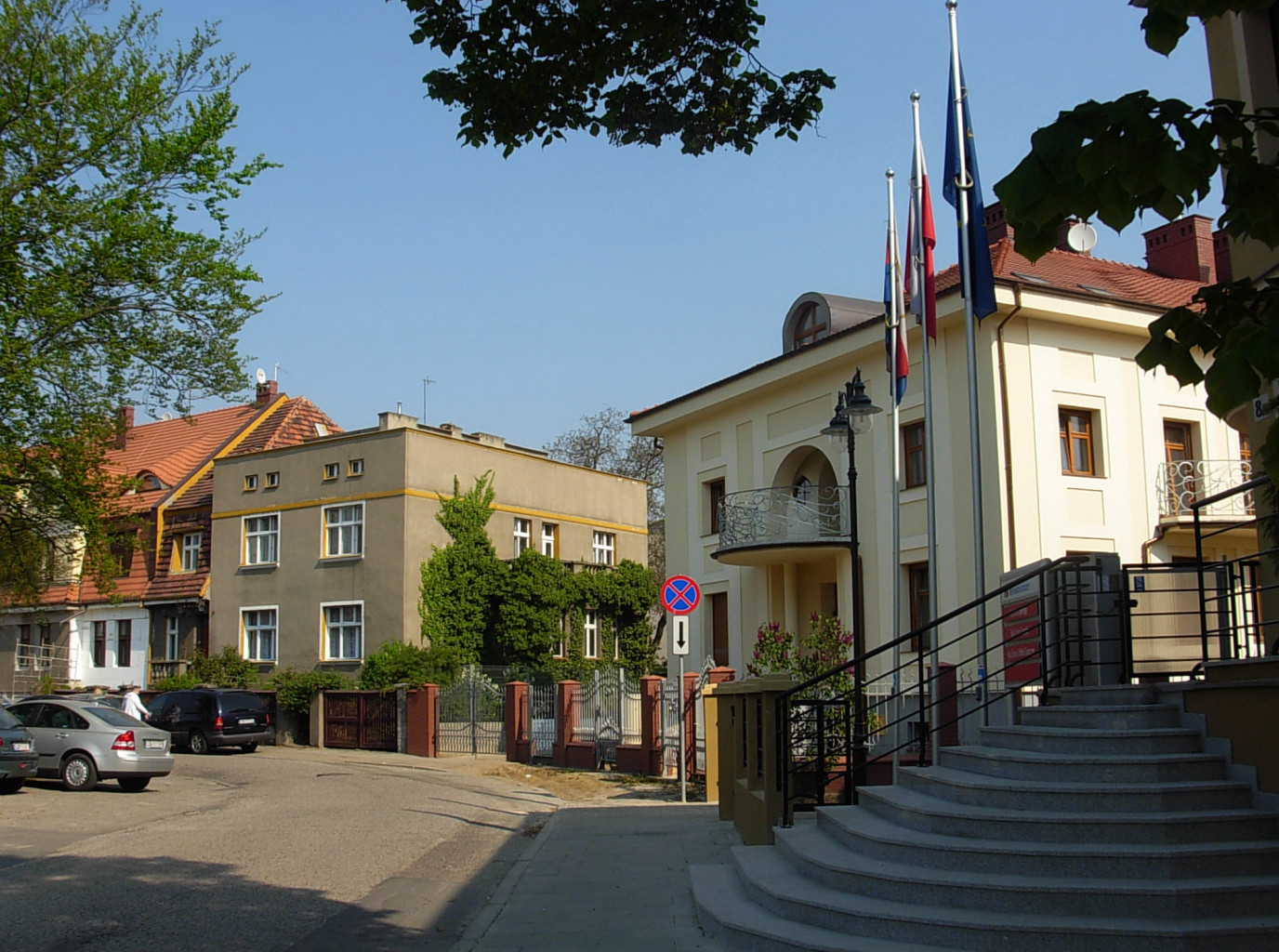
House at 10 (right), 12 (center) and 14 (right)

=== Villa at 14 ===
1914–1915, by Otto Brech

Art Nouveau

First registered at 8 Mackensen Platz, it was owned from 1917 to 1922 by Johann Lengwenus, working in the railroad domain. In 1923, the new landlord was Stanisław Bonneberger, who worked as a manager. He lived there until the onset of WWII.

This is the oldest villa in the street, one of the first realization as part of the initial Sielanka project. It bears some late Art Nouveau elements, faded by successive renovations. One can appreciate the barrel roof wall gable and the eyelid dormer.

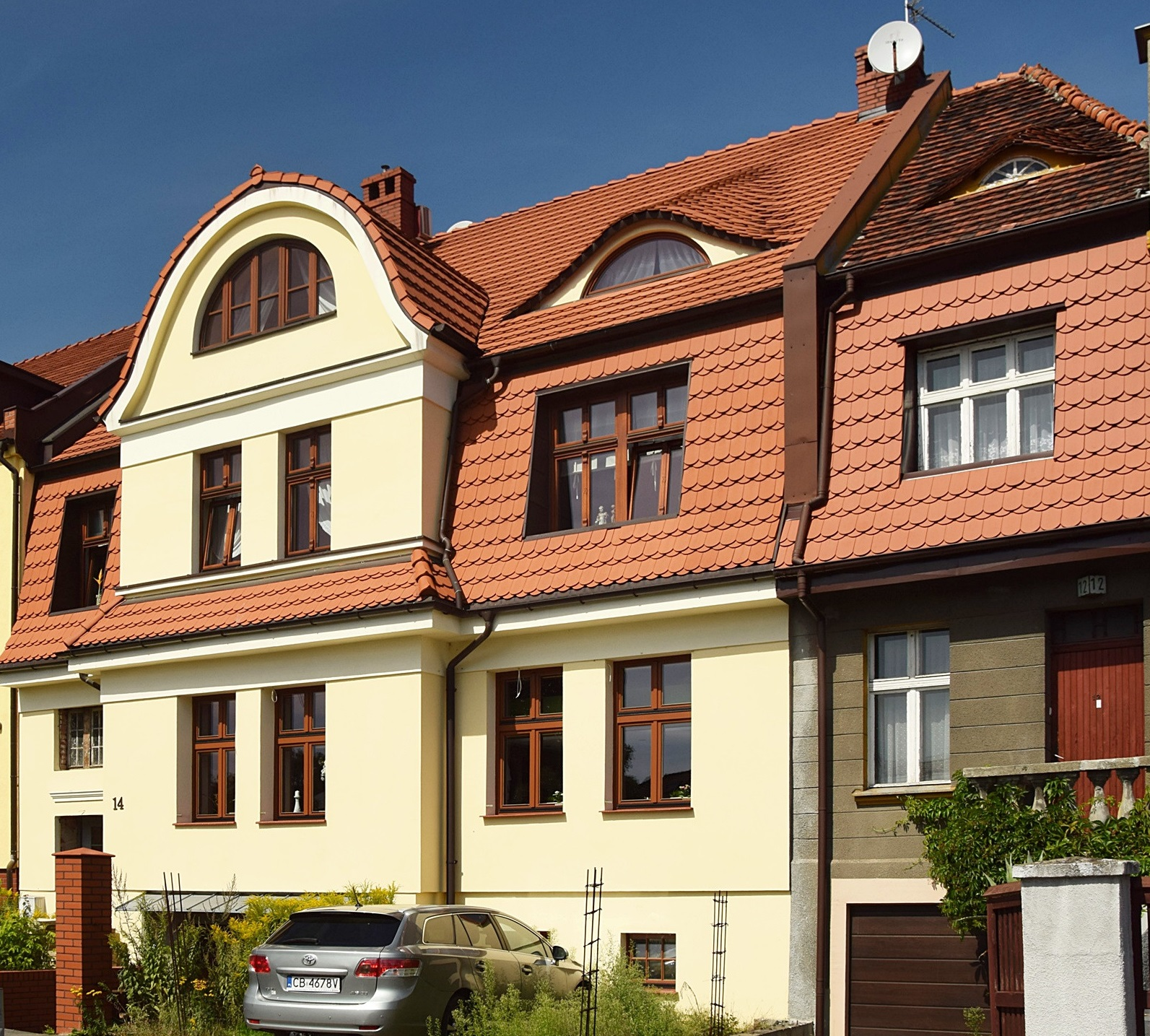
Facade onto Sielanka street and Turwid Square

=== Villas at 16/16a ===
1932–1933, by Witold Eysymont

Functionalism

First landlords were Zygmunt Sioba (house at 16), a deputy attorney at the Sejm and Teodor Ziabicki, a manufacturer (house at 16a).

These adjoining houses, with distinctive functionalist traits, kept some nice stained glass windows highlighting both building staircases.

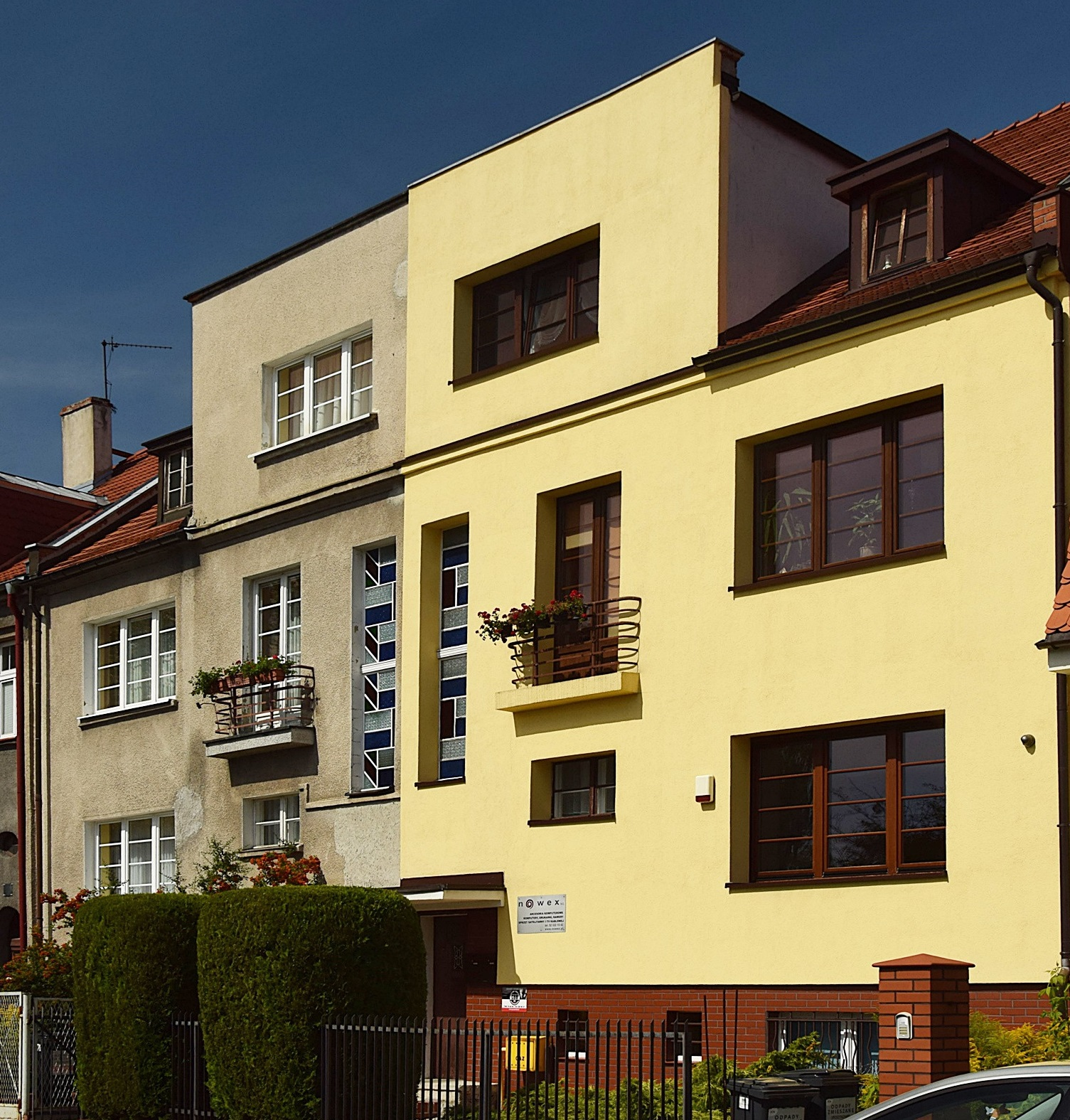
Facade of 16 (right)

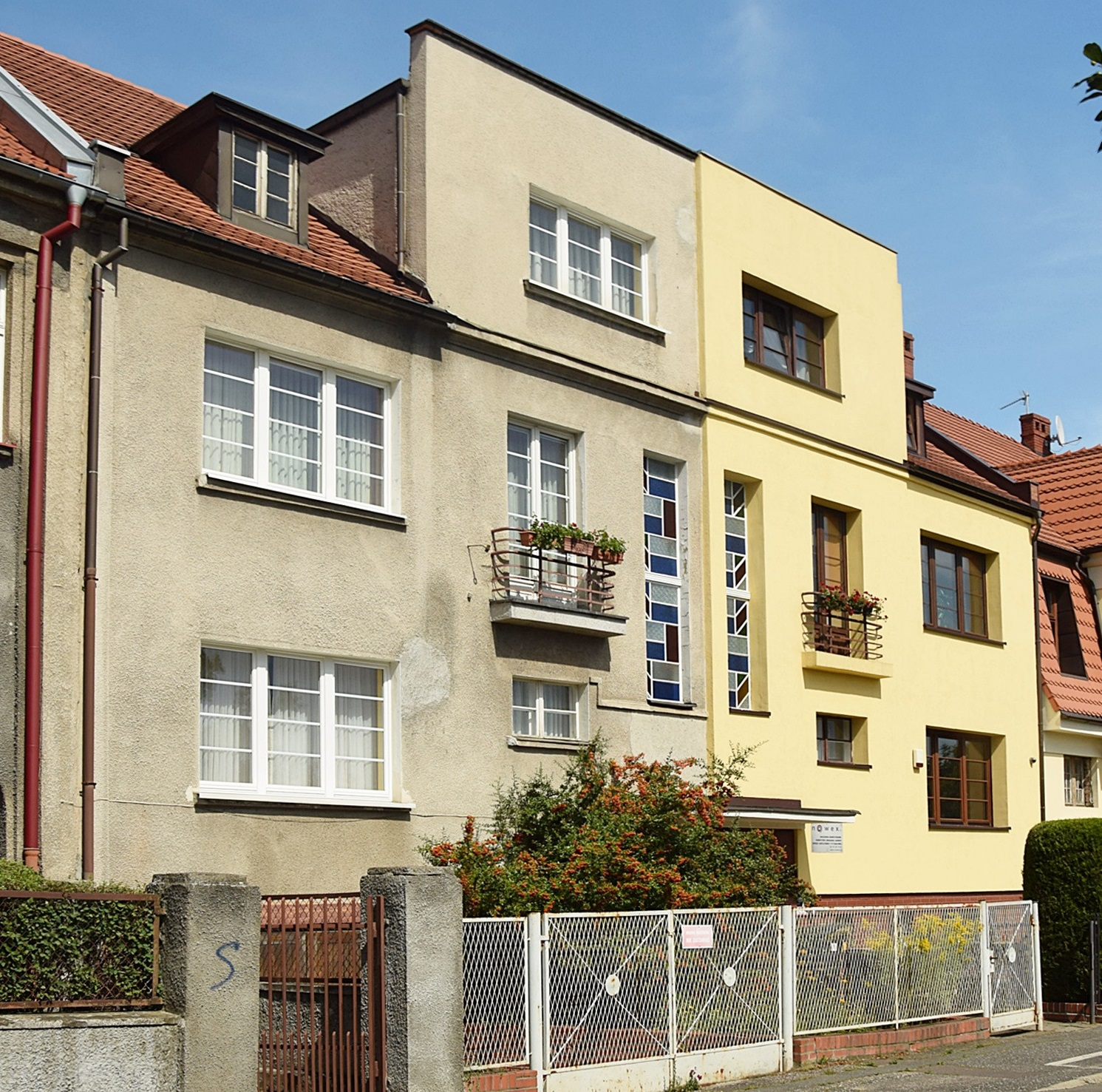
Facade of 16a (left)

=== Villa at 18, corner with Czesłowa Miłosza ===
1927–1930, by Józef Grodzki

Early Modernism

The commissioner of the villa in the late 1930s was Łucjan Grabowski, a clerk, living at 54 Gdańska Street.

Although heavily marked by early modernist features, one can notice on the Sielanka facade a fanlight above the entrance door and a wall gable dormer. The elevation on Czesłowa Miłosza street supports also a wall dormer, together with a wrought iron balcony.

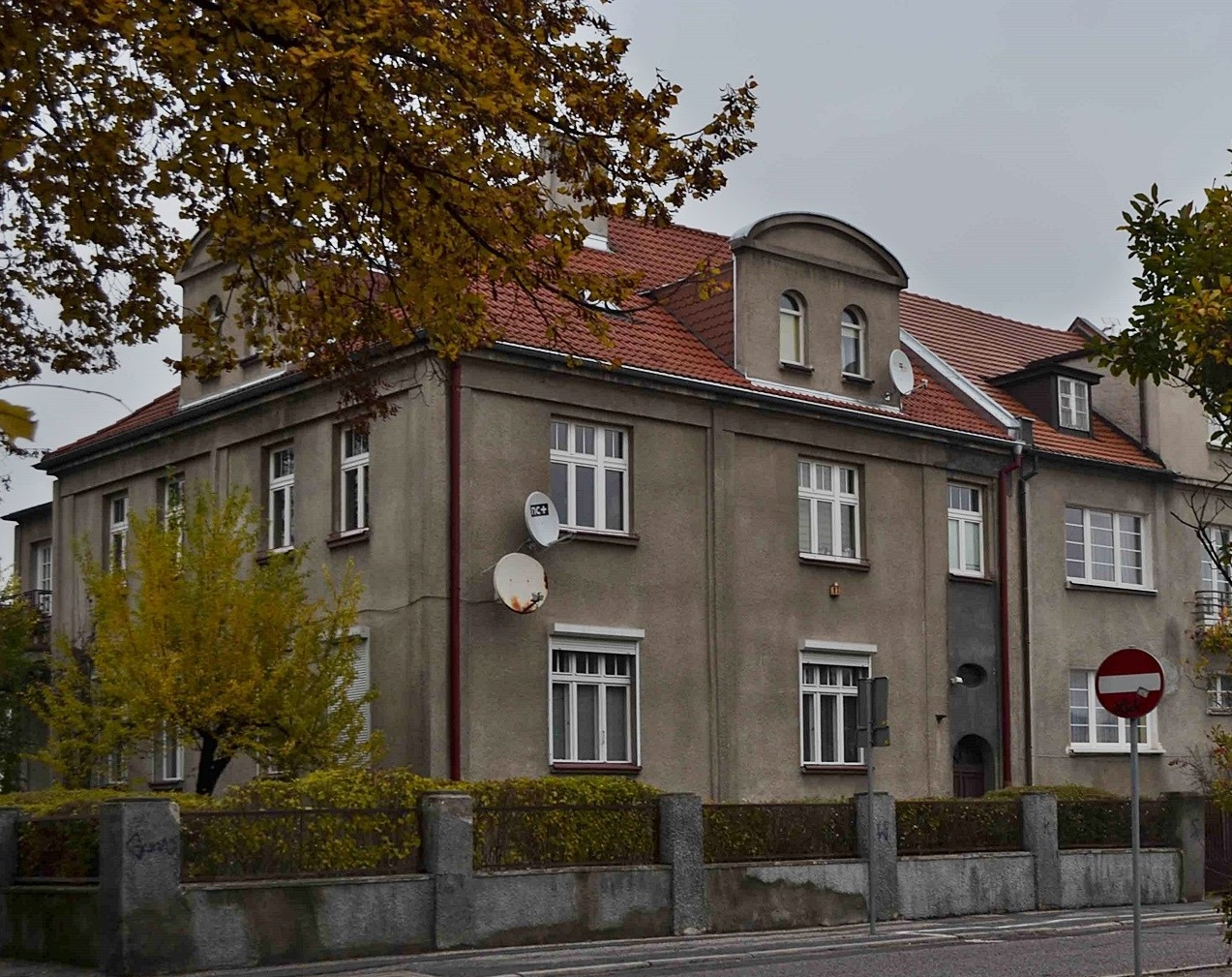
View from street crossing

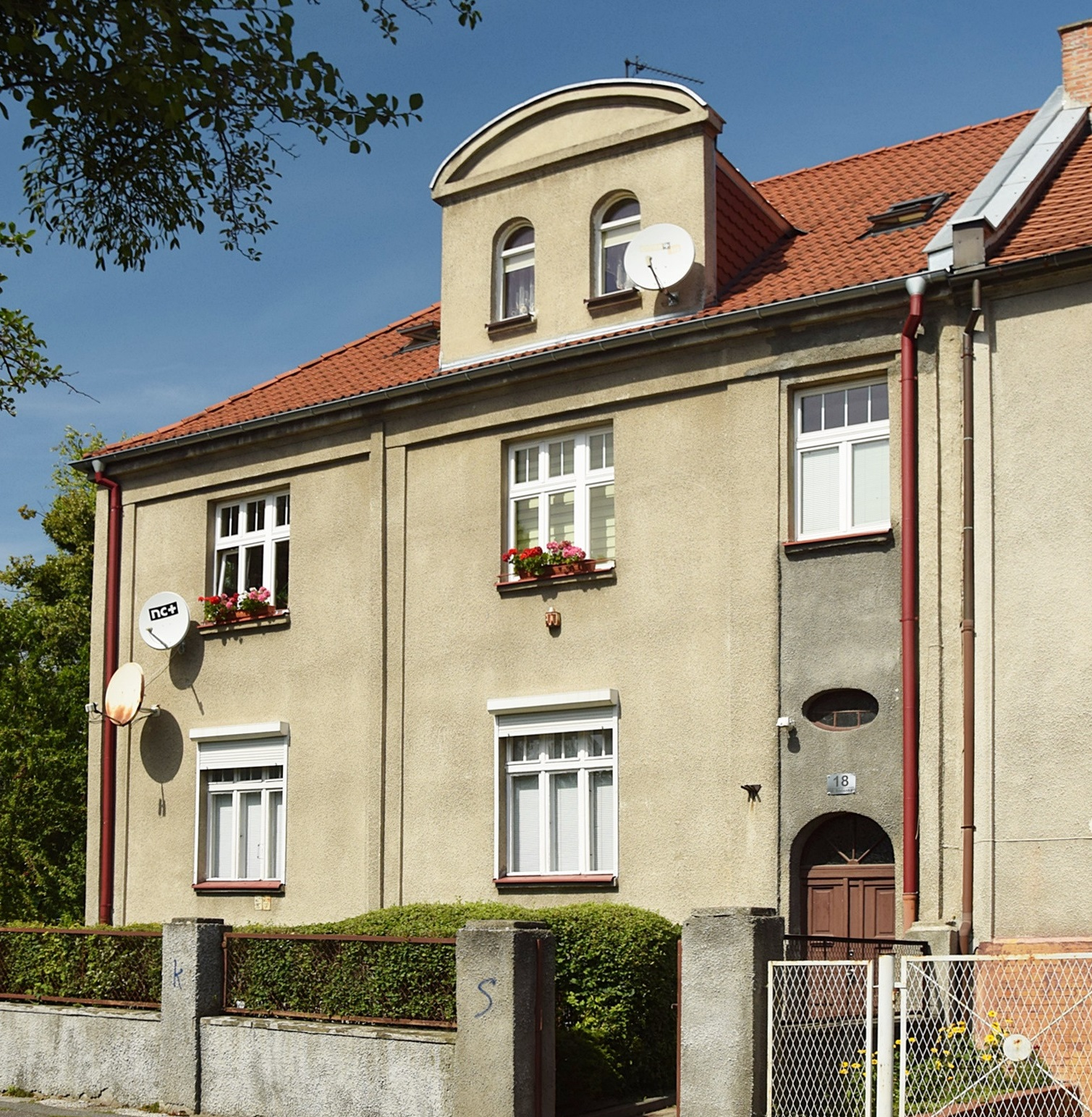
Main facade on Turwid Square
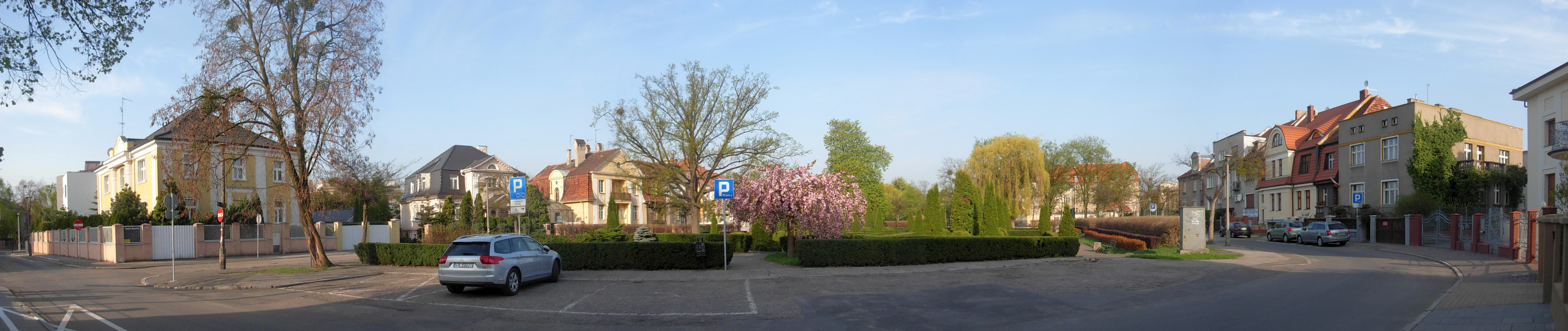
Panorama of Turwid square: in the backdrop Wyspiańskiego street (left), Sielanka street (right)

== See also ==
- Bydgoszcz
- Sielanka estate, Bydgoszcz
- Bydgoszcz Architects (1850-1970s)
