= Marian Turwid =

Polish painter and writer (1905–1987)

Marian Turwid-Kaczmarek
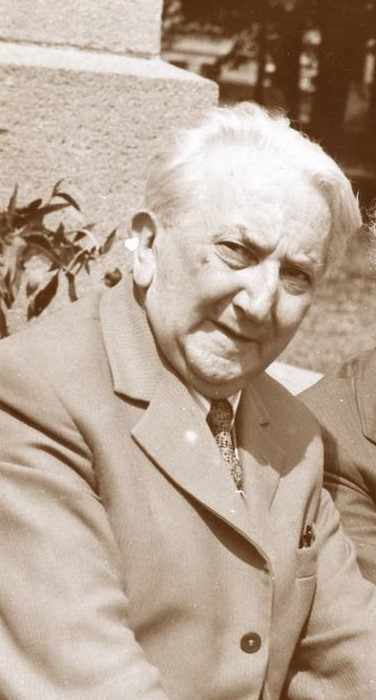
- Marian Turwid (c. 1980s)
- Born: 28 September 1905; Września, German Empire
- Died: 7 December 1987 (aged 82); Warsaw, Poland
- Resting place: Catholic Nowofarny cemetery in Bydgoszcz; 53°08′25″N 18°00′16″E
- Known for: Painting, literature
- Awards

Marian Turwid-Kaczmarek, also known as Marian Turwid (28 September 1905 – 7 December 1987) was a Polish writer, painter and cultural activist in Bydgoszcz, and member of the National Committee of the National Unity Front (Polish: Front Jedności Narodu, FJN) in 1958.

== Biography ==
=== Period under German Empire rule ===
Marian Turwid was born on 28 November 1905 in Września, at the time located in the Province of Posen, Prussia. He was the son of Kazimierz Kaczmarek, a merchant and Julia, née Jakubowska. After graduating from Września primary school, he studied at the gymnasium and then at the State Male Teachers Seminary (Polish: Państwowe Seminarium Nauczycielskiego Męskiego) in Gniezno: there he passed the matura exam in 1926.

=== Interwar period ===
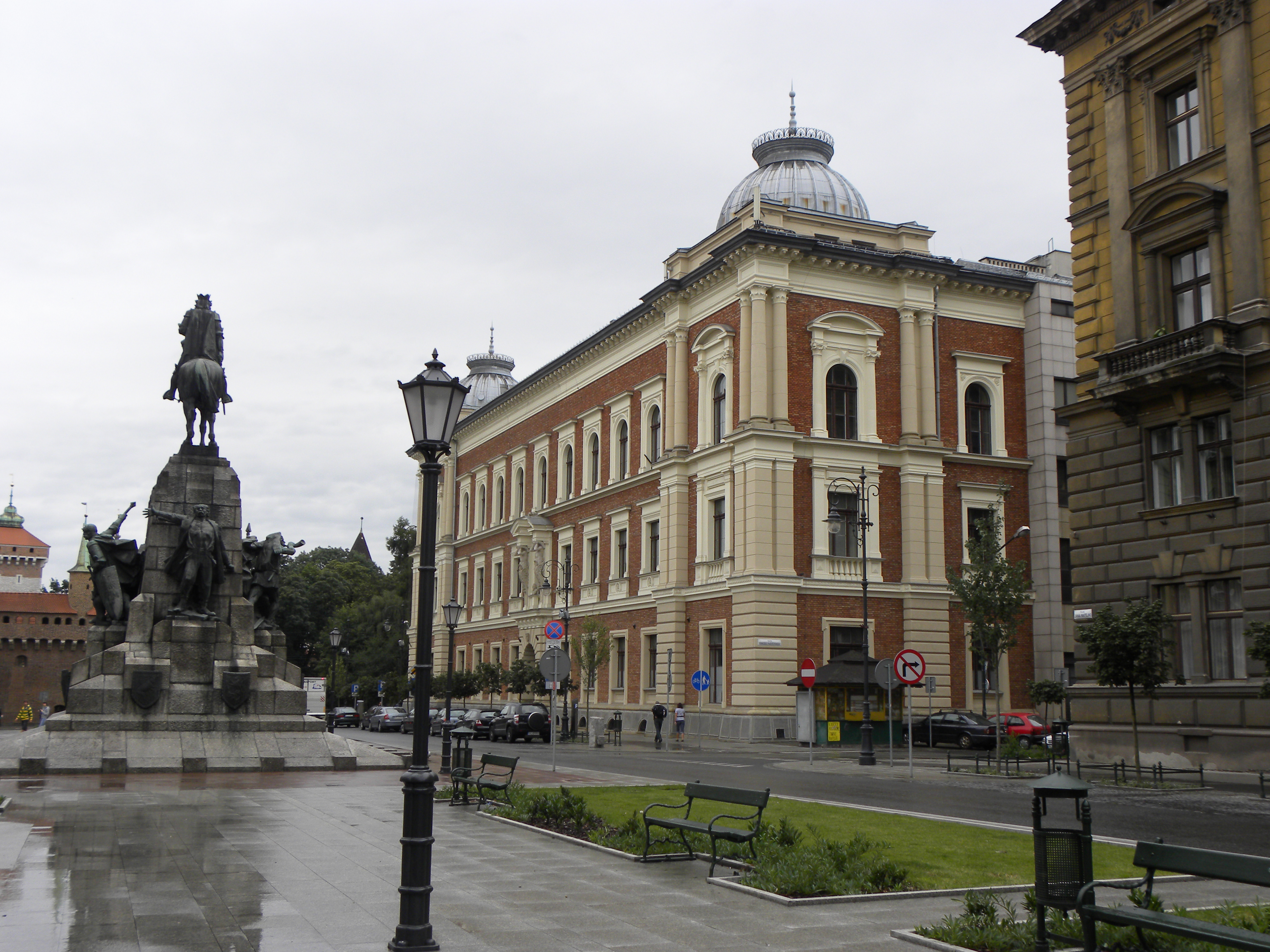
Building of the Academy of Fine Arts in Kraków

With his matura, he became in 1926, a teacher at a public elementary school in Borzykowo in Września County. Between 1926 and 1929, Marian studied at the Academy of Fine Arts in Kraków at the Faculty of Painting and Sculpture. He learned under the guidance of a number of professors, including Władysław Jarocki, Teodor Axentowicz, Xawery Dunikowski and Fryderyk Pautsch. On December 3, 1929, he passed the drawing exam for teachers and completed his studies in October 1930.

From 1931 onwards, Marian Turwid was a drawing teacher at High School No. 6 in Bydgoszcz. In 1935, he obtained professional qualifications allowing him to teach drawing in Polish in general secondary schools or as a state/private teacher in training seminaries.

Meanwhile, he took an active part in the artistic life of Bydgoszcz and Greater Poland. He was the chairman of the Pomeranian Artists' Union and the secretary of the Artistic and Cultural Council of Bydgoszcz (1937–1939). From 1930, he was a member of the Association of Polish Artists and Designers (as will be in 1945, Bydgoszcz sculptor Piotr Triebler) and Polish Writers' Union.

As a writer and artist, Marian made his debut in the Września Spokesman (Polish: Orędownik Wrzesiński).

In 1926, his first book was published, Legends of Września, and a year later, the first exhibition of his paintings was held in Września. From this moment on, Marian started using the nickname Turwid. Later, he will change his name to Turwid-Kaczmarek. Between 1931 and 1937, he has been the chief editor of the artistic and literary monthly Wici Wielkopolskie.

In 1931, he published a book of drawings Szkice portretowe (Portrait Sketches) and a portrait of General Józef Haller, which was his diploma work crowning his studies at the Kraków Academy of Fine Arts. In 1932, a volume of poetry was published, Dni Wielkiej Doliny (The Days of the Great Valley). Some of his poems found their way up into national anthologies, such as Morze w poezji polskiej (Sea in Polish Poetry) in 1937 or Antologia 120-u (120th Anthology) in 1939 and 1947. Turwid also wrote articles about culture and literature for several daily newspapers: Kurier Poznański, Dziennik Bydgoski, Gazeta Bydgoska, and Przegląd Bydgoski. From time to time, he contributed to the Poznań cultural monthly Tęcza (Rainbow magazine) and the Kashubian Gryf (Griffin). He made various artistic trips to hone his painting skills: Paris (1936), Vienna, Berlin and Budapest. In 1936, Marian Turwid joined the Grupa Plastków Bydgoskich, gathering local artists like graphic designer Stanisław Brzęczkowski, painter Władysław Frydrych and sculptor Teodor Gajewski.

The main topic of his works was aiming at the issue of tradition versus present day in the Wielkopolska-Pomeranian region. Many poems were devoted to Bydgoszcz and his symbols: The Archer, the old granaries, Mill Island, the Cathedral, the Bydgoszcz Venice (pl). These places and figures released in him the need for a personal tie with the city's architecture, its nature and its inhabitants. His identity reflects the 1930s local mood towards organizing an environmental culture in Bydgoszcz, open to national literary trends.

=== World War II period ===
In the first days of the German occupation, Marian was arrested by the Gestapo, who confiscated his studio with all his artistic works. In autumn 1939, he moved to his hometown Września where he worked in his parents' company until 1942. From 1942 to 1945, he was employed by Paul Hantsche, who hired him as a painter.

=== Post-war period ===
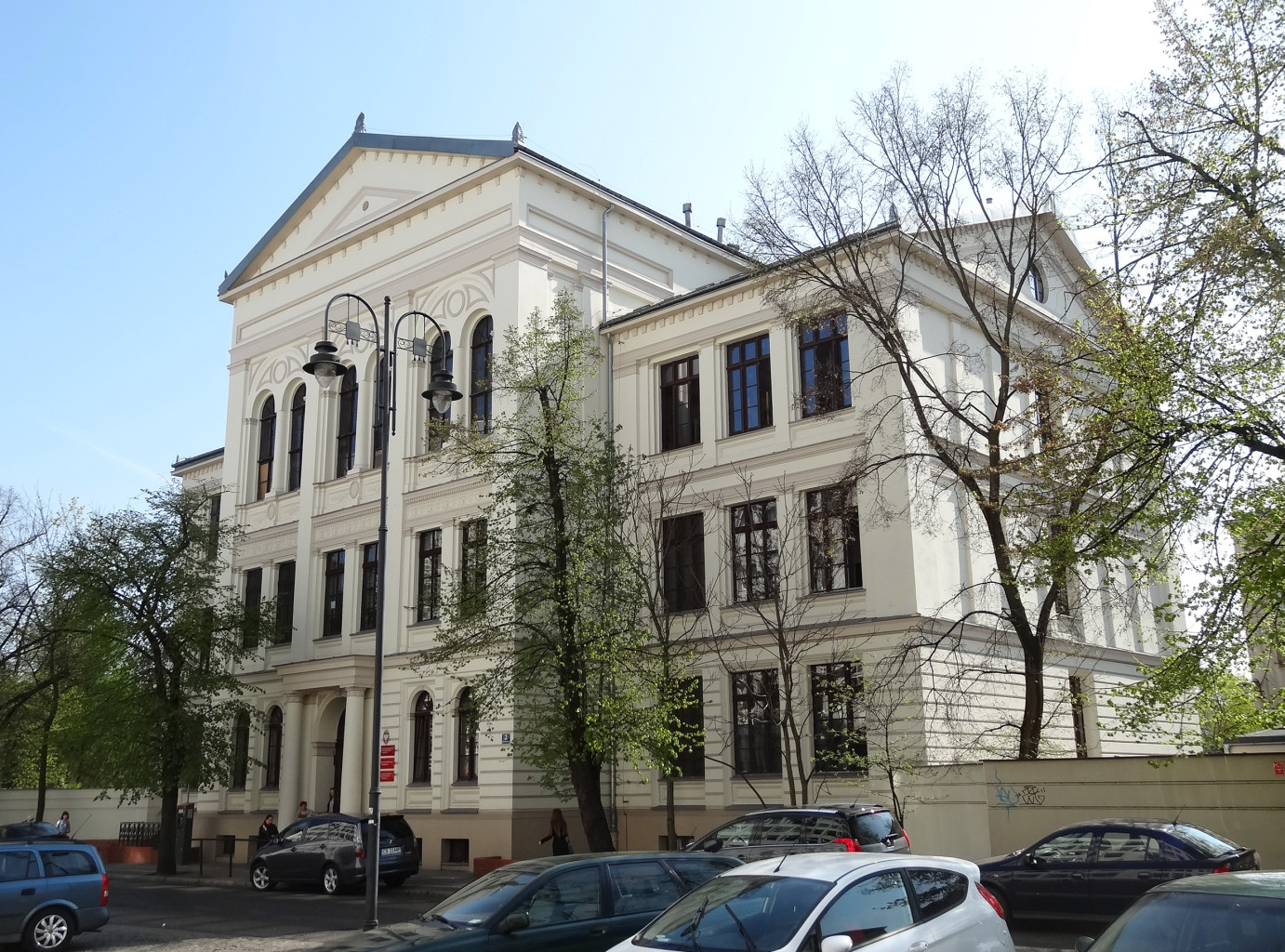
Bydgoszcz School of Fine Arts

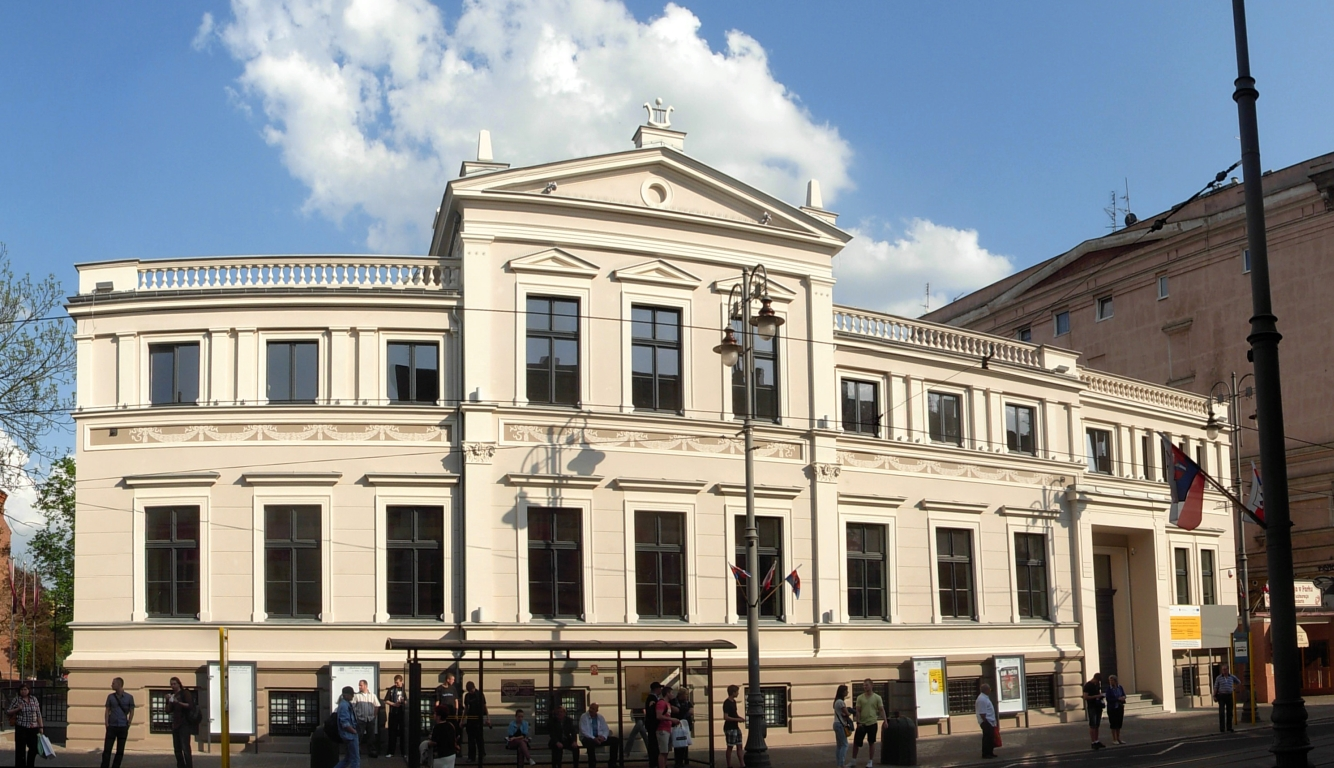
Pomeranian Arts House in Bydgoszcz

In March 1945, Marian Turwid returned to Bydgoszcz, where he was designated head of the Fine Arts Department at the Office of Culture and Art of the Pomeranian Voivodeship. He was the lead editor of the cultural supplement Ilustrowany Kurier Polski, ordering articles from writers and scientists from all over Poland. In 1946, he set up in Bydgoszcz the State School of Fine Arts (renamed in 1947 the State Secondary School of Fine Arts) and was its first director until 1972, when he retired. The school still stands today at 2 Konarskiego street. At the same time, he became director of the State Center for Art and Culture in Bydgoszcz. On his initiative, the Pomeranian Arts House in Bydgoszcz was created, where a permanent art exhibition was established with contributions coming from Pomeranian members of the Association of Polish Artists and Designers. From 1950 to 1972, he led the Central Bureau of Artistic Exhibitions, Bydgoszcz Branch (Polish: Centralne Biuro Wystaw Artystycznych Oddział w Bydgoszczy), together with the Toruń branch.

Influential cultural and artistic activist, Marian Turwid co-organized in 1945 the Bydgoszcz Literary and Artistic Club, the Pomeranian branch of the Association of Polish Artists and Designers and the Pomeranian Association of Polish Writers. He was a co-founder and chief editor of the journal Arkona, one of the first cultural magazines in Poland along with the Lublin-based Kamena. For many years (1961–1983), he was active in the Kujawsko-Pomorskie Towarzystwo Kulturalne (Kuyavian-Pomeranian Cultural Society).

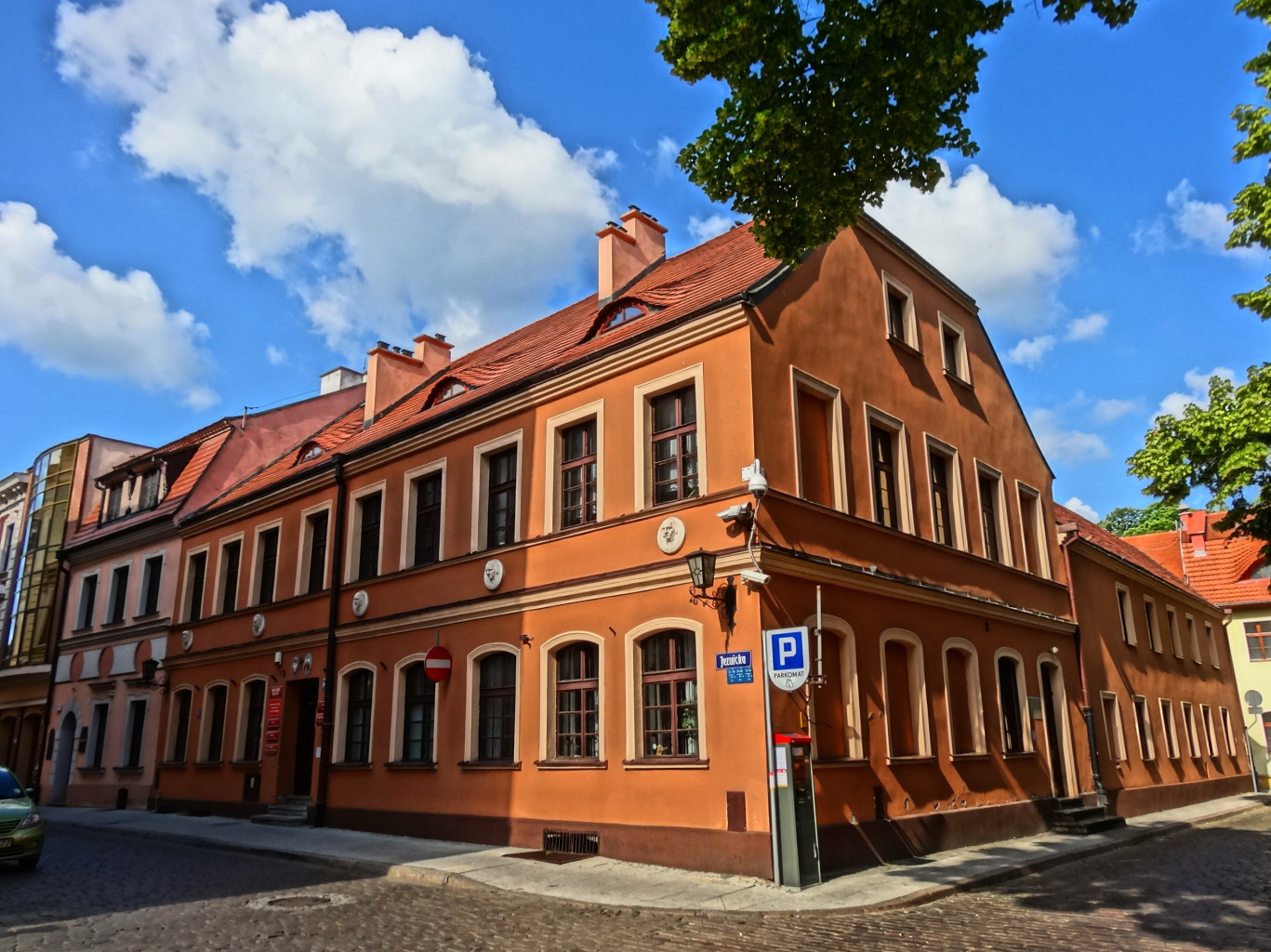
Seat of the Bydgoszcz Scientific Society

Between 1945 and 1975, Marian Turwid issued nearly 700 original books and works published in local and national magazines. Some of Turwid's poems were published in almanacs: Poeci Pomorscy (Pomeranian Poets) in 1962 and in Poeci i morze (Poets and the Sea) in 1969 (Gdańsk edition). His works often revolved around the people and topics of the region in which he lived and worked. As a citizen of Bydgoszcz, councilor and democrat activist, he coped with themes related to the city:

- he wrote the history of the Regional Museum "Leon Wyczółkowski" for the opening ceremony;
- for the 600th anniversary of the city in 1946, he composed about its history and culture;
- he defended the Bydgoszcz Venice area against attempts at modernization;
- he campaigned for the preservation of Bydgoszcz granaries and the development of the Regional Museum.

His articles, prefaces to catalogs and materials, gathered in collective local publications portray his knowledge of the city, in particular its post-war specifics.

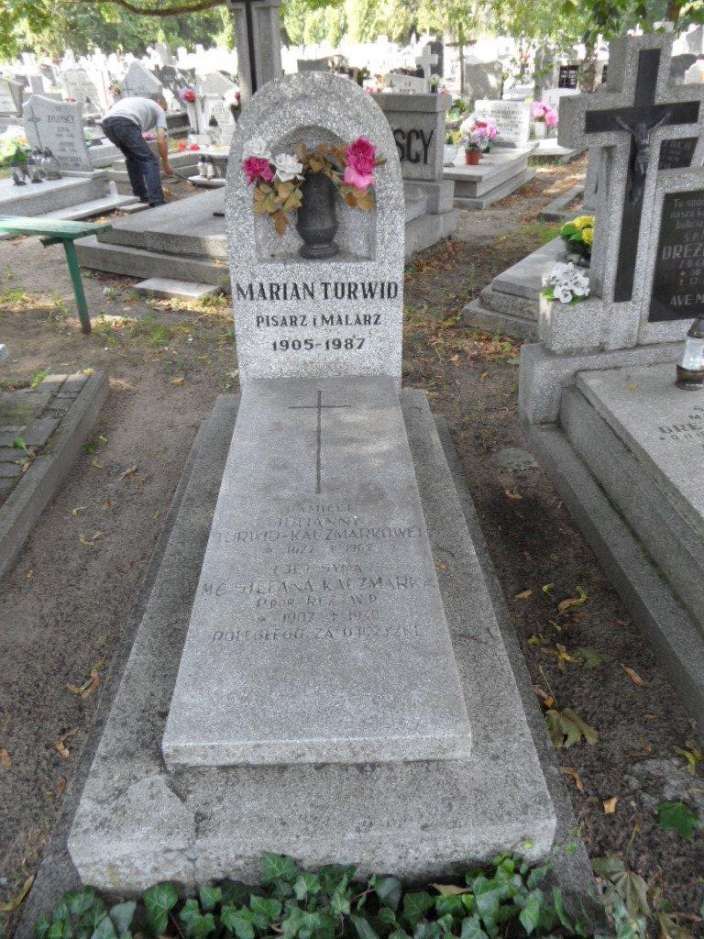
Marian Turwid's Tombstone

As far as his artistic side is concerned, Marian Turwid was rather prolific: out of his 189 works, 125 were displayed at exhibitions in Poland and abroad.

After a long period of disinterest towards politics, he joined the Labour Party in 1945, then the Democratic Party (Polish: Stronnictwo Demokratyczne, SD) in 1950: in 1955–1956, Turwid was the vice-president of the Presidium of the Provincial SD Committee in Bydgoszcz, and in 1963 he became the SD chairman of the Provincial Advisory Group for Culture, member of the SD Central Committee Advisory Group for Culture. From 1965 to 1973, he was a councilor of the Bydgoszcz Province and from 1954 to 1961, a member of the Municipal Council of Bydgoszcz. He was a long-time activist in the Front of National Unity and then a member of the Patriotic Movement for National Rebirth (Polish: Patriotyczny Ruch Odrodzenia Narodowego, PRON).

In the late 1950s, Marian co-initiated and managed with Andrzej Szwalbe the Bydgoszcz Scientific Society (Polish: Bydgoskie Towarzystwo Naukowe). He was also active in a multitude of cultural and scientific organizations and associations. His commitment to culture was assessed by his biographers as follows:

He was probably a member of all commissions, teams and committees in Bydgoszcz, if they had any connection with cultural matters. [...] He was almost a cultural institution by himself [...].

Marian Turwid died unexpectedly of a heart attack on 17 November 1987. He had a broadcast on the Polish Radio station of Bydgoszcz a few days prior. He was buried at the Nowofarny Cemetery in Bydgoszcz. He was sincerely mourned by Bydgoszcz artistic circles.

=== Family ===
Marian Turwid married Zofia Nowicka from Bydgoszcz in 1936. She was the granddaughter of Władysław Piórek, a physician, social and national activist.

Zophia Turwid was a journalist, passionate about culture and art.

The couple had no children.

== Works ==
Marian Turwid's works are shown in different museum collections: Bydgoszcz, Grudziądz, Toruń, Regional Museum of Września, the Leo Tolstoy State Museum in Moscow, a museum in Reggio Emilia, as well as in the Polish Theater in Bydgoszcz and at the seat of the Bydgoszcz Scientific Society at 2 Jezuicka Street.

=== Writings ===
- Wiersze (Poems), 1949 - poetry;
- Żelazny krzyż (Iron cross), 1959 - short stories;
- Noc nad Dolina (Night over the Valley), 1961 - a novel;
- Wyprawy po diamenty (Adventures for diamonds), 1966 - essays on art, supplemented by the 1986 edition of Przygody ze sztuką;
- Dwie strony drogi (Two sides of the road), 1969 - a novel (new edition in 1983);
- Ślady burzy (Traces of the storm), 1971 - short stories;
- Słowa na palecie (Words on the palette);
- Między wiosnami (Between springs), 1974 - fictional memories from childhood and youth;
- Pędzlem i piórem (With a brush and a pen), 1977 - poems;
- W zakolu Brdy (In the bend of the Brda river), 1979 - poems;
- Dni Wielkiej Doliny (Days of the Great Valley), 1981 - short stories published on the occasion of the writer's 75th anniversary, bearing the same title as his first collection of poetry from 1932;
- Znaki przydrożne (Roadside signs);
- List z Bydgoszczy (Letter from Bydgoszcz);
- Przymierze z Brdą (Alliance with the Brda river);
- Niedziele bydgoskie (Bydgoszcz Sundays).

=== Paintings ===
- Bezrobotny (Unemployed), oil painting, 1932;
- Królowa Panieńska (Maiden Queen), triptych, 1932;
- Portret kobiecy (Portrait of a woman), oil painting, 1934;
- Św. Jerzy (St. George), 1938, placed in Bernardine Church of Our Lady Queen of Peace, Garrison church in Bydgoszcz;
- Portret Józefa Hallera (Portrait of general Józef Haller);
- Portret Narzeczonej (Portrait of the Bride);
- numerous other portraits of cultural activists in Bydgoszcz.

In the 1950s, Turwid's painting work was largely focused on Bydgoszcz landscape:

- Motyw Bydgoski Al. 1 Maja (Bydgoszcz Motif at May 1st Avenue), 1954;
- Motyw Bydgoski Spichrze (Bydgoszcz Granaries Motif), 1956;
- Spichrze nad Brdą (Granaries on the Brda River), 1956;
- Śródmieście Bydgoszczy (Downtown Bydgoszcz), 1956;
- Motyw Bydgoska Fara (Bydgoszcz Fara Motif), 1957;
- Zakole Brdy (Bend of the Brda river), 1962 and 1969;
- Barki na Brdzie (Barges on the Brda river), 1969;
- Puszcza Bydgoska (Bydgoszcz Forest), 1972;
- Motyw z Bazyliką (Motif with the Basilica), 1978.

== Awards and recognitions ==
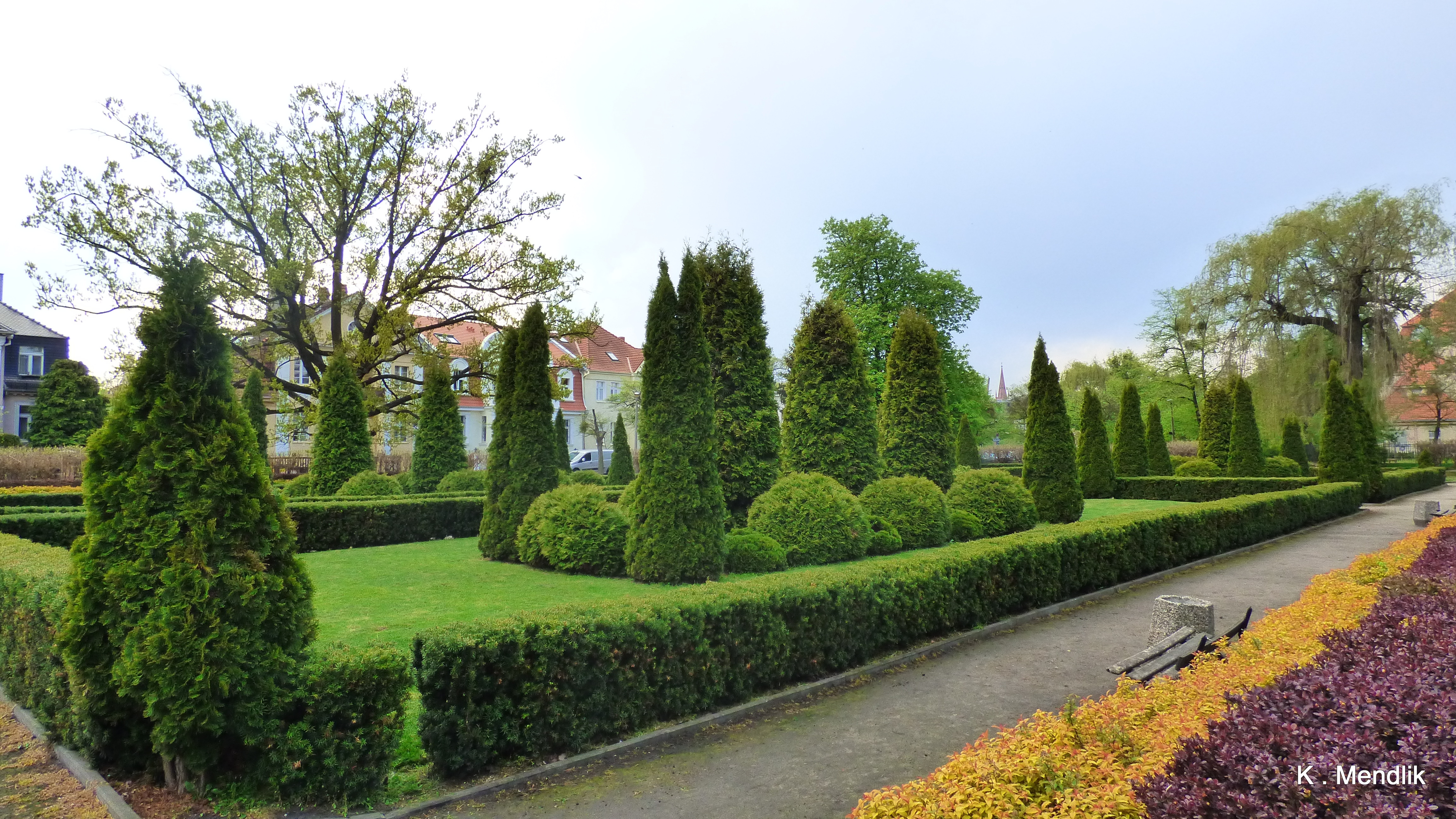
Marian Turwid Square

Since November 1990, his name has been given to Bydgoszcz Primary School Nr.16 at 74 Koronowska street.

In the 1990s, a square in downtown Bydgoszcz has been named after Marian Turwid, located in Sielanka street, where he lived at Nr.8. One of the new trams in service in Bydgoszcz in 2017 received the name of Marian Turwid.

A street in Września has been named after Marian Turwid.

=== Honors ===
- Cross of Merit (Silver rank-1946, Gold rank-1952 & 1956);
- Medal of the 10th Anniversary of People's Poland (1955);
- Artistic award of Bydgoszcz for lifetime cultural and artistic activity (1956);
- Provincial artistic award for lifetime achievement in literature and art (1959);
- Medal Bydgoszcz for Meritorious Citizen (1960);
- Medal for Meritorious Cultural Activist (1964);
- Order of Polonia Restituta (Knight's Cross-1964, Officer's Cross 1976);
- Medal for Special contributions to the development of the province of Bydgoszcz (1965);
- Millennium Medal (1966);
- Medal of the 30th Anniversary of People's Poland (1975);
- Medal of the National Education Commission (1978);
- Award of the Minister of Culture and Art for lifetime social and artistic activity (1981);
- Order of the Banner of Work, 2nd class (1984);
- Medal of the 40th Anniversary of People's Poland (1985);
- Gold Badge of the Association of Polish Artists and Designers.

== See also ==
- List of Polish painters
- BWA – Municipal Art Gallery of Bydgoszcz
- Władysław Piórek

== Bibliography ==
- Błażejewski Stanisław, Kutta Janusz, Romaniuk Marek (1995). Bydgoski Słownik Biograficzny. Tom II (in Polish). Bydgoszcz: Kujawsko-Pomorskie Towarzystwo Kulturalne. pp. 146–149. ISBN 8385327274.
- Bartelski M., Lesław (1995). Polscy pisarze współcześni, 1939-1991: Leksykon (in Polish). Bydgoszcz: Wydawnictwo Naukowe PWN. ISBN 8301115939.
- Bartelski M., Lesław (1986). Literatura polska. Przewodnik encyklopedyczny (in Polish). Warsaw: Wydawnictwo Naukowe PWN. ISBN 8301015209.
- "Pięćdziesiątka ZPAP Bydgoszcz", Exhibition catalog, 2008, Bydgoszcz
