= Ossoliński Alley, Bydgoszcz =

Dual carriageway road in Bydgoszcz, Poland

Coordinates: 53.1280°N 18.0154°E

Ossoliński Alley
Bydgoszcz
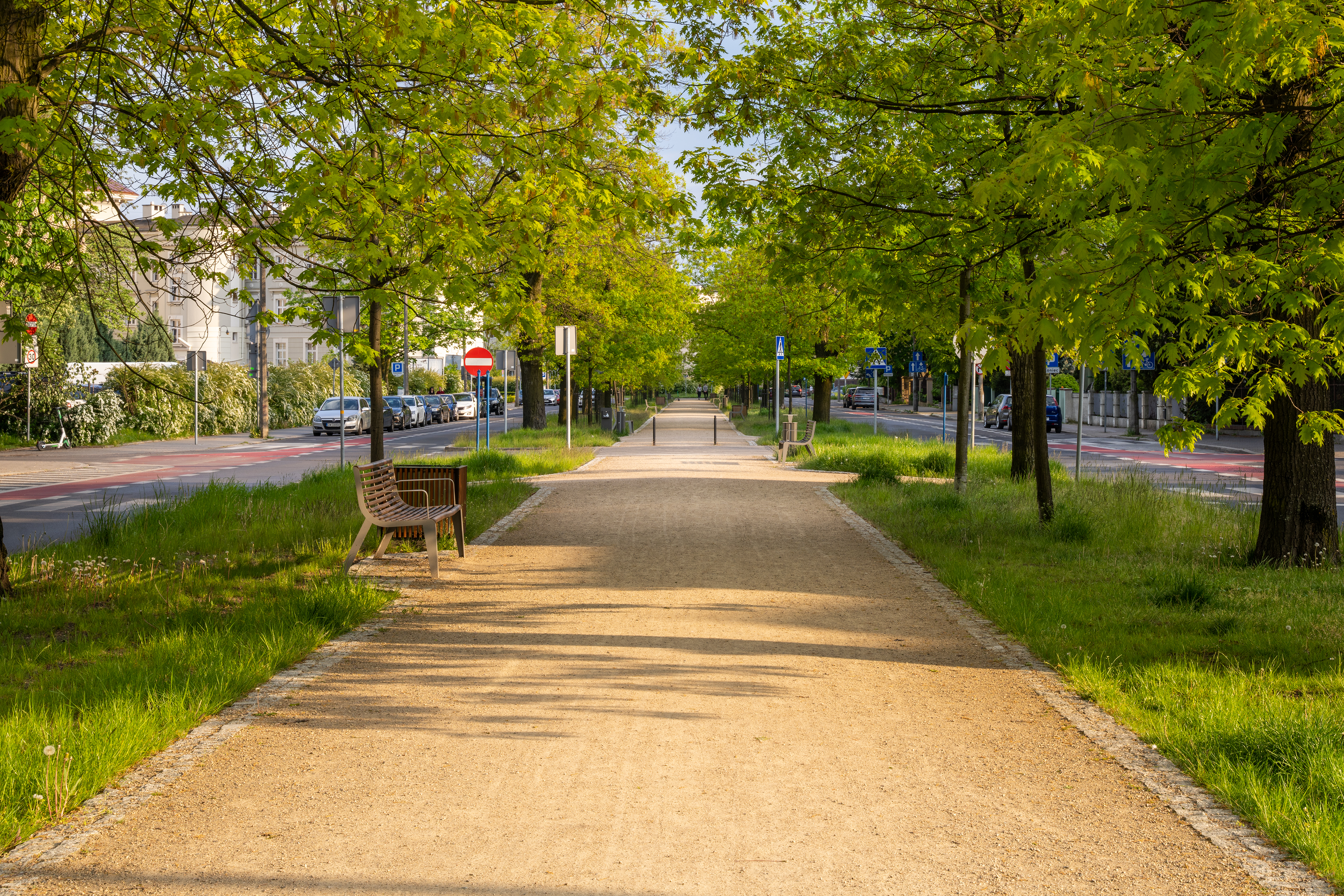
- View of the street

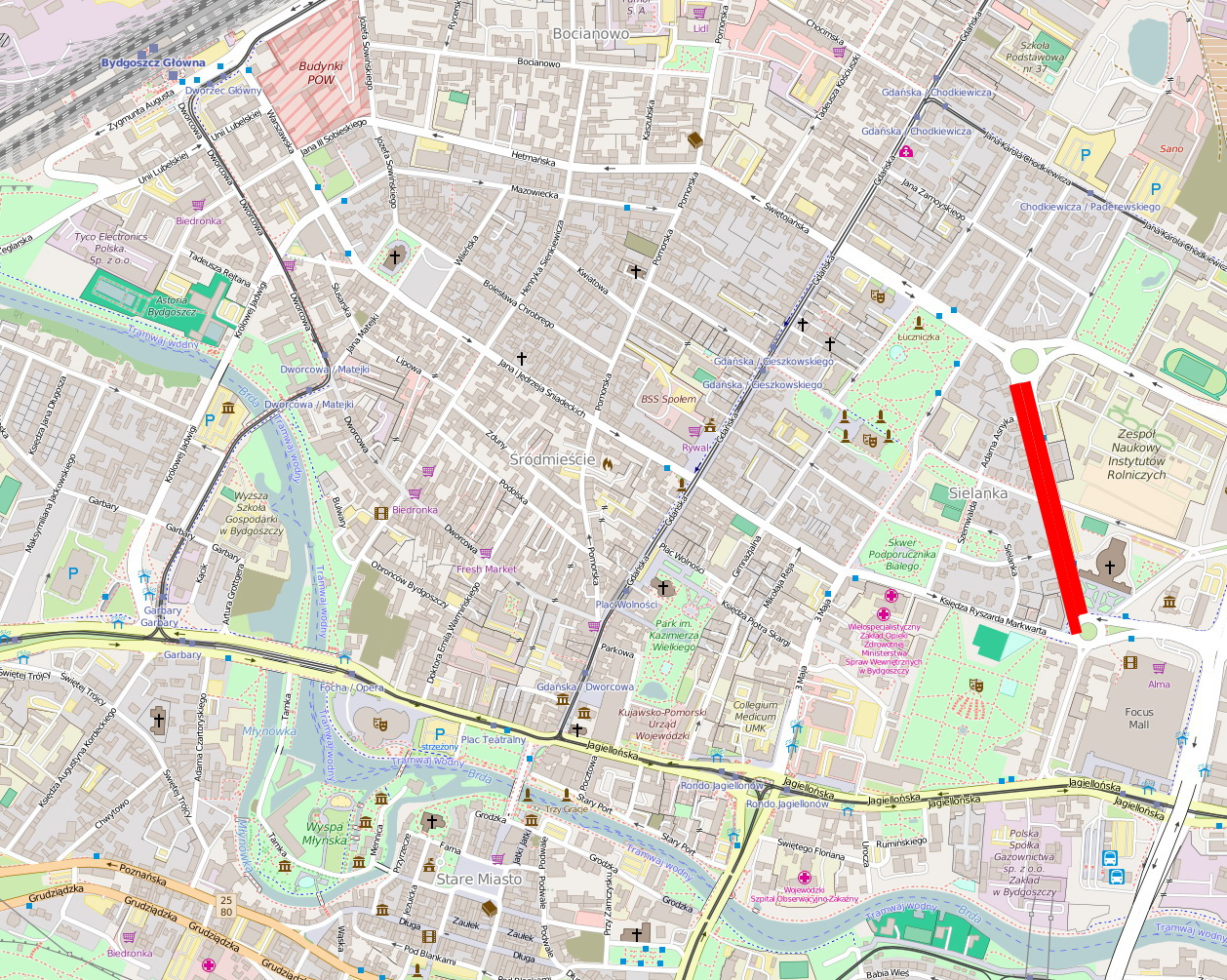
- Location of Ossoliński Alley
- Native name: Aleja Ossolińskich w Bydgoszczy (Polish)
- Former names: Hohenzollernstrasse, Johann Herder Allee
- Part of: Bydgoszcz Old town district
- Namesake: House of Ossoliński
- Owner: City of Bydgoszcz
- Length: 500 m (1,600 ft)
- Location: Bydgoszcz, Poland

Ossoliński Alley is a large dual carriageway road located in downtown Bydgoszcz.

== Location ==
The avenue is located in the eastern part of the downtown Bydgoszcz and links J. Weyssenhoff Square with Ossoliński roundabout.

== Naming ==
Through history, this street had the following names:

- From 1906 to 1920, Hohenzollernstrasse, from the House of Hohenzollern;
- From 1920 to 1939, Ossoliński Alley;
- From 1939 to 1945, Johann Herder Allee;
- Since 1945, Ossoliński Alley

The namesake of the street comes from is among the House of Ossoliński, associated with Bydgoszcz in the 17th century with in particular Jerzy Ossoliński (1633–1645, 1648–1650) and his son Francis (1645–1648), Starosts of Bydgoszcz and Crown Chancellor.

== History ==
Ossoliński Alley has been laid out in 1903, in the same conditions of urban development as Adam Mickiewicz Alley in the eastern area of Gdańska Street called "Hempelscher Felde": this plot was bought in the 1890s by the municipality to develop a garden city, the Sielanka estate, based on the works of Hermann Stübben.

This axis was a dual carriageway avenue lined up with trees, called Hohenzolernstrasse in its south part, Bülowstrasse in it north part (in 1920 it became part of Adam Mickiewicz alley). The construction of the avenue has been completed in 1903; this was then the widest street in the city: 40 m wide, it had two carriageways, and in a pedestrian walkway in the middle with lawn and trees (red oaks with festoons of Virginia creepers. Street inception was in direct relationship with the erection in 1902 of buildings for the Kaiser Wilhelm's first university and scientific institution in Bydgoszcz (German: Kaiser "Wilhelm's Institut für Landwirtschaft zu Bromberg"). The institute architectural ensemble has been erected on the eastern side of the street between 1903 and 1906. By contrast, the area on the western side of the alley has been planned and designed in 1912 by German architect Josef Stübben. However, most of the villas in this district ("Sielanka" or Idyll) have been essentially erected during interwar period.

In 1924, the south-western tip of Ossoliński Alley has been identified to accommodate the construction of St. Vincent de Paul's Basilica, the largest religious edifice in Bydgoszcz, and one of the largest in Poland. The whole complex has only been completed in 2003.

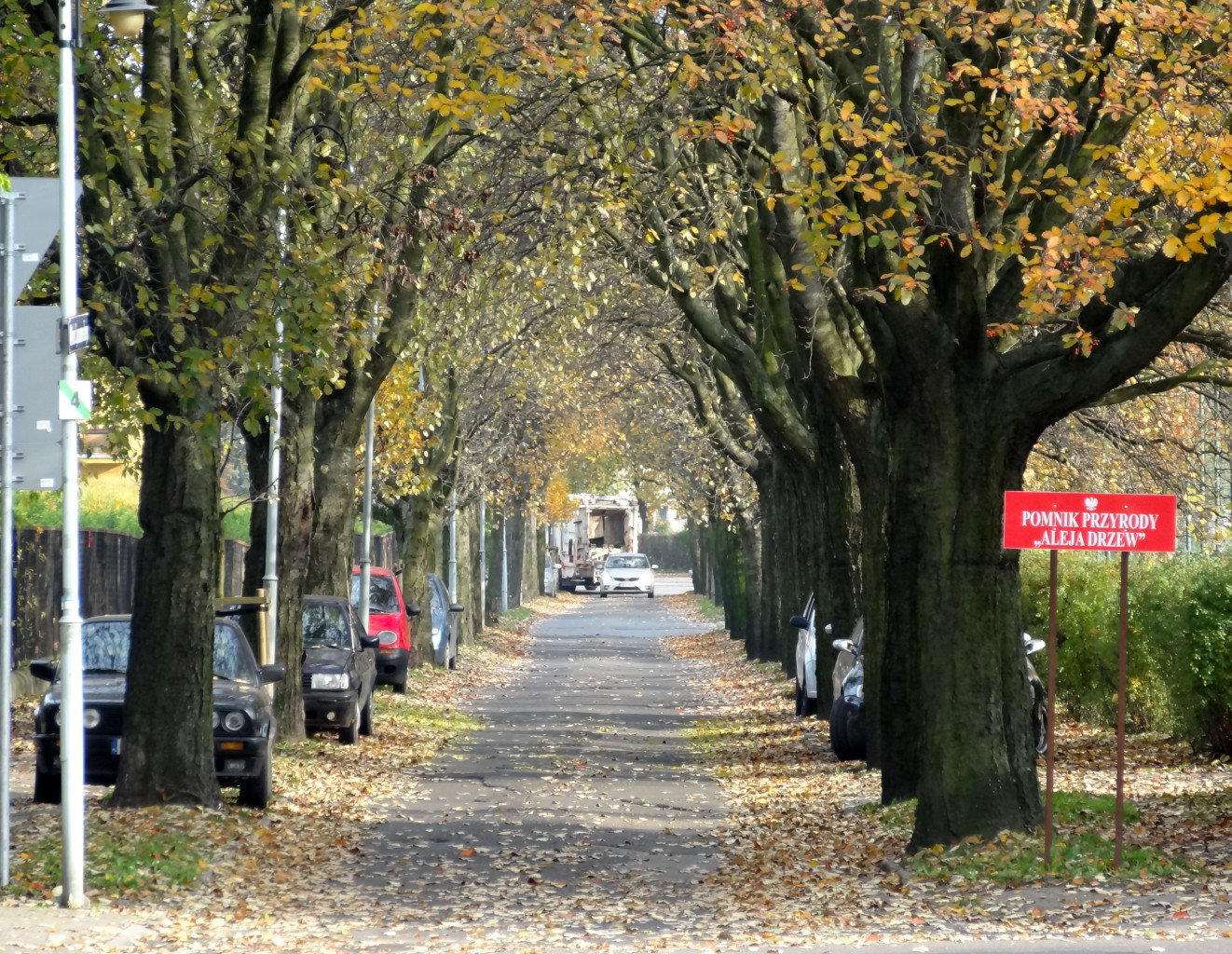
Karol Szymanowski alley

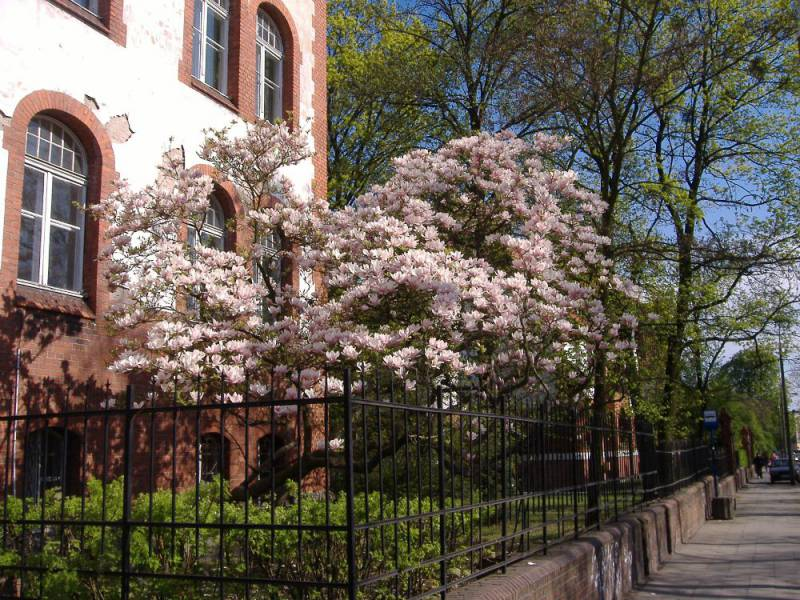
Magnolia at 12 Ossolinski

In the 1950s, an urbanization project designed and created in Bydgoszcz two "clone" avenues of Ossoliński alley with two lanes, middle tree planted sidewalk: 11 November street (Leśne district) and Stanisław Noakowski street (Kapuściska district).

== Green ==
The alley has two rows of red oaks planted at the beginning of the 20th centurytwentieth century. Four of them are listed as Polish monuments of nature:

- Three Magnolias at 12;
- One horse-chestnut at 3.

Karol Szymanowski alley, crossing the southern part of Ossoliński avenue is unique by the presence of a monumental perspective of 46 specimens of Swedish whitebeams, all listed as Polish monuments of nature.

== Main places and buildings ==
=== St. Vincent de Paul's Basilica, at 2 ===
Registered on Kuyavian-Pomeranian Voivodeship heritage list, Nr.601231, Reg. A/846/1-2, 30 May 1996.

1925–1939, by Adam Ballenstedt

Neoclassicism

The basilica, completed in 1945, has been designed by Polish architect Adam Ballenstedt and comprises the church, a monastery and a park. Minor Basilica dedication has been carried out during a ceremony chaired by Pope John Paul II, on 3 June 1997

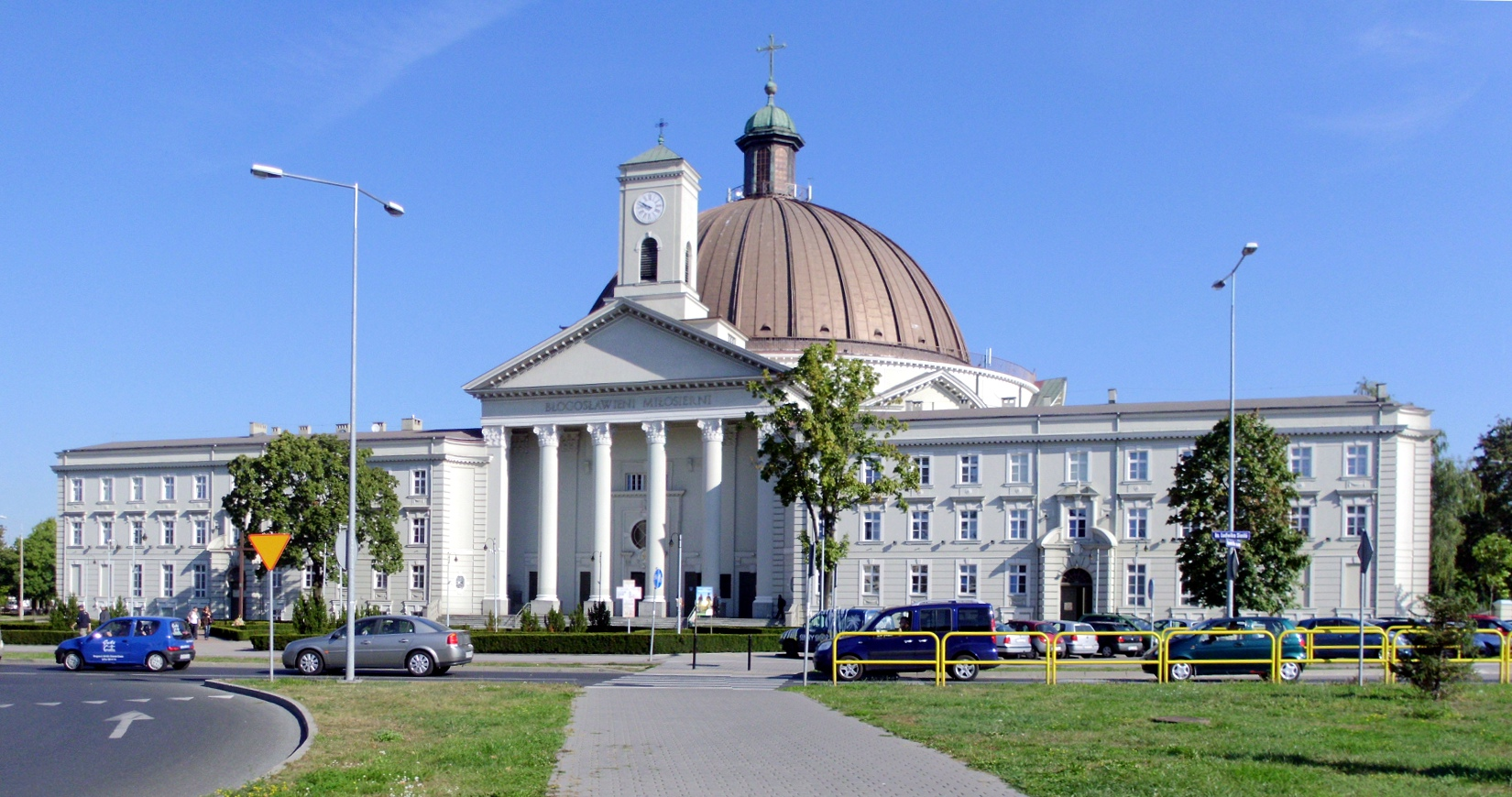
General view

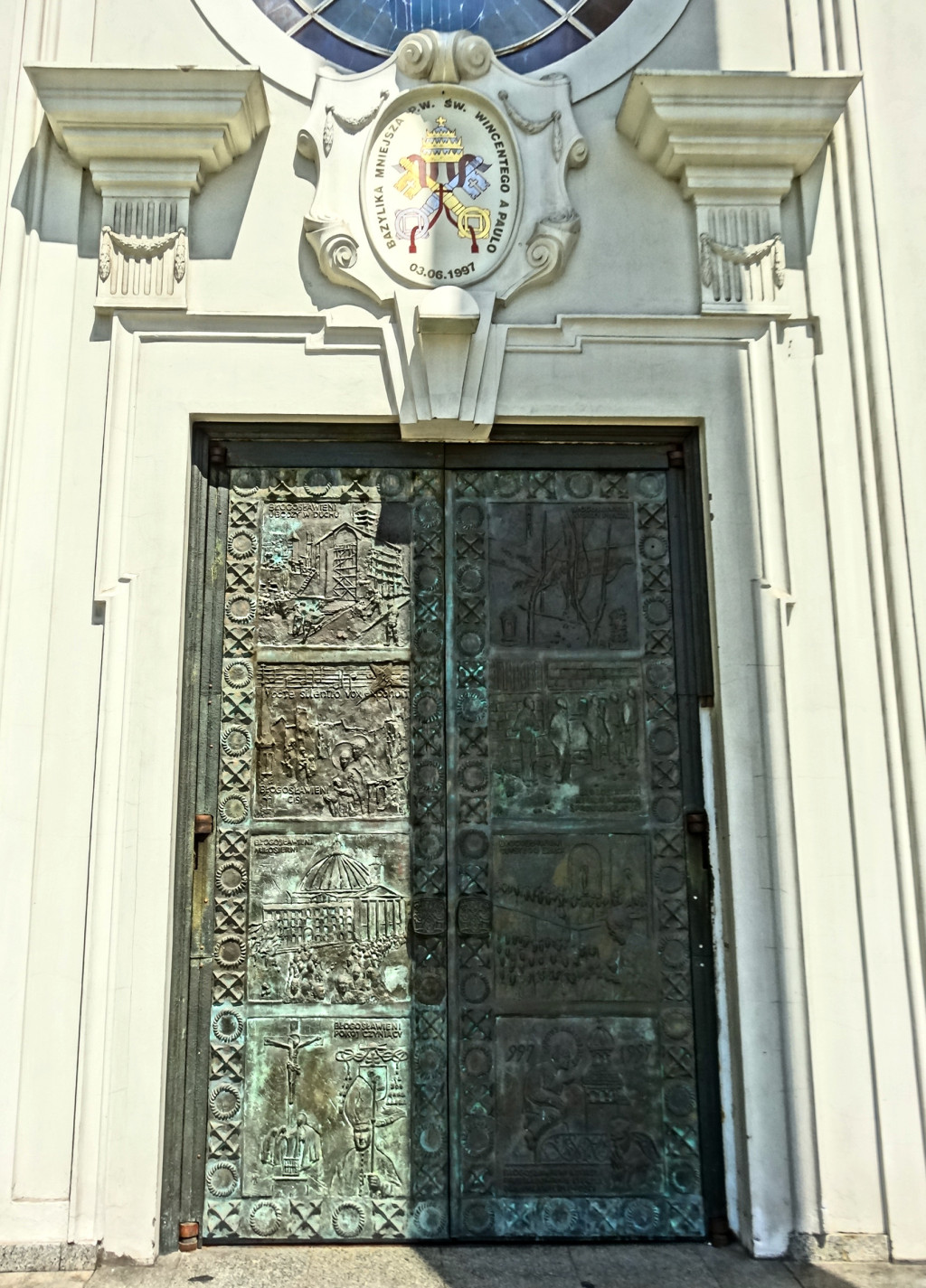
Doors of Blessings

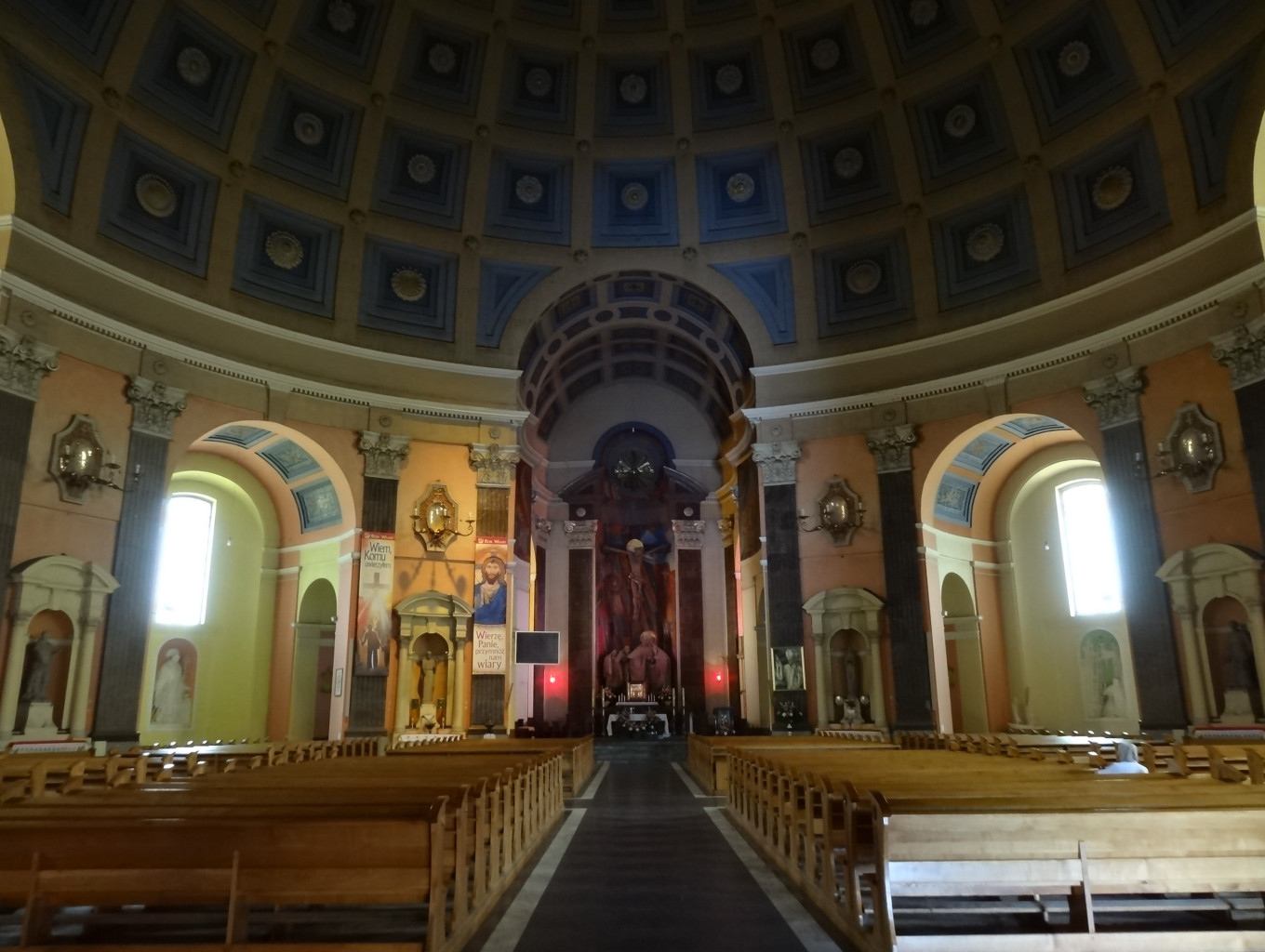
Nave view

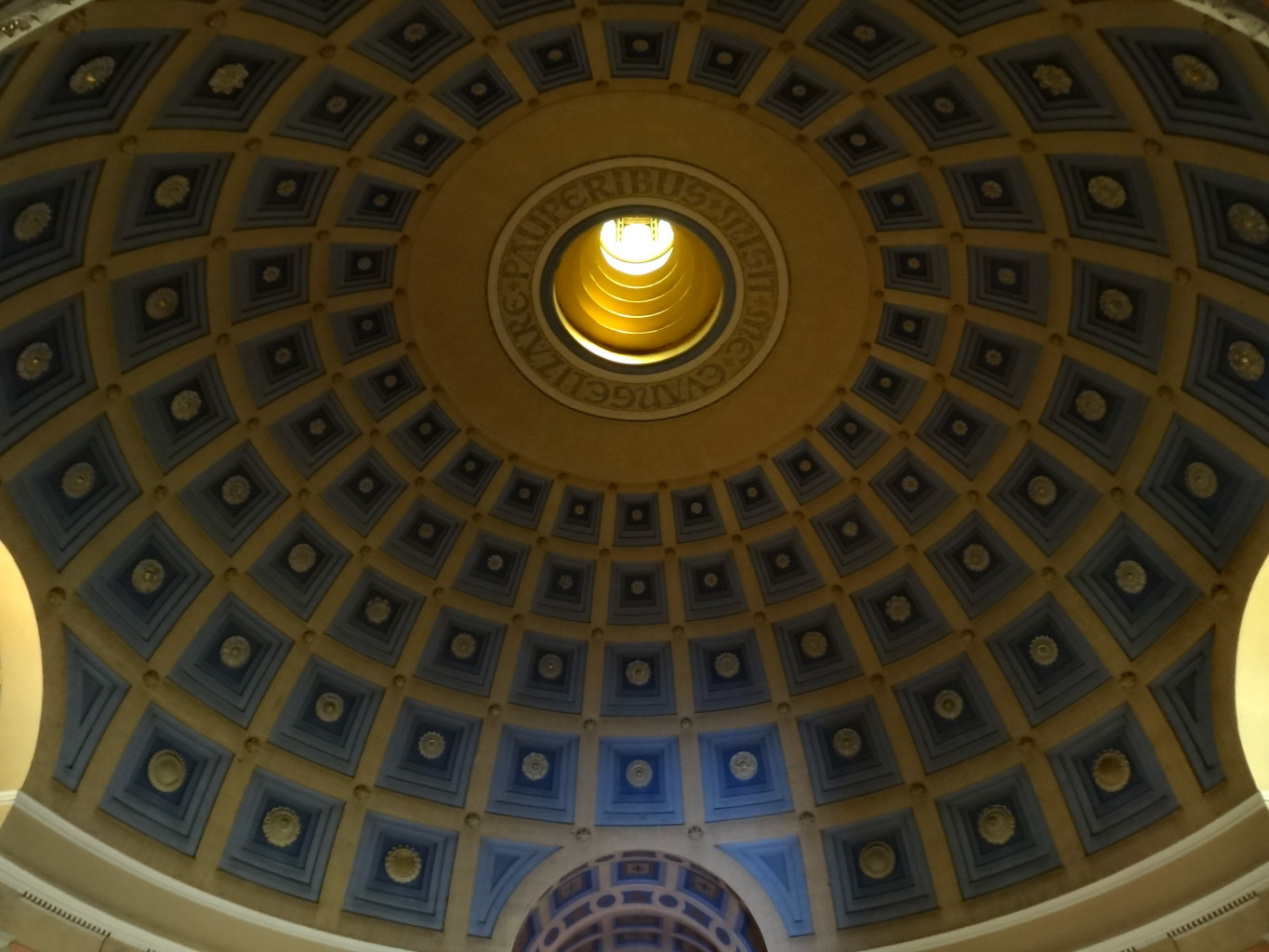
Inside dome

=== Buildings of the Institute of Agriculture ===
Registered on Kuyavian-Pomeranian Voivodeship heritage list, Nr.601253, Reg. A/676/1-8, 20 May 1992

1903–1906, by H. Delius

Eclecticism

The architectural ensemble of the Institutes of Agriculture in Bydgoszcz occupies an area of 7.5 hectares, between J. Weyssenhoff Square, Ossolińsky Alley, Powstańców Wielkopolskich Alley and Karol Szymanowski Street. The western area is laid out with buildings, the eastern one is a 5 ha zone of field vegetation, with livestock, greenhouses and a barn.

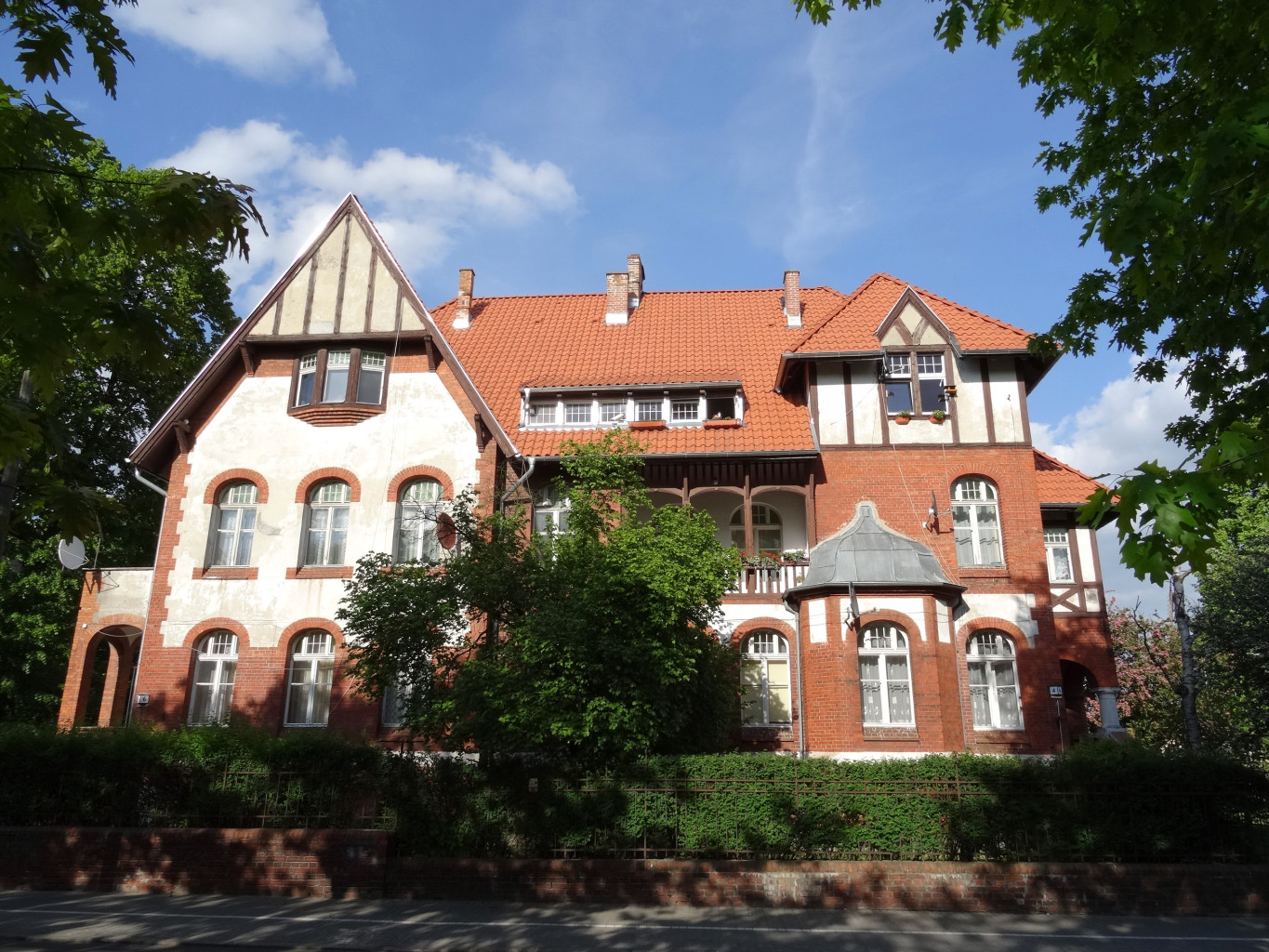
Main facade of Nr.4/6

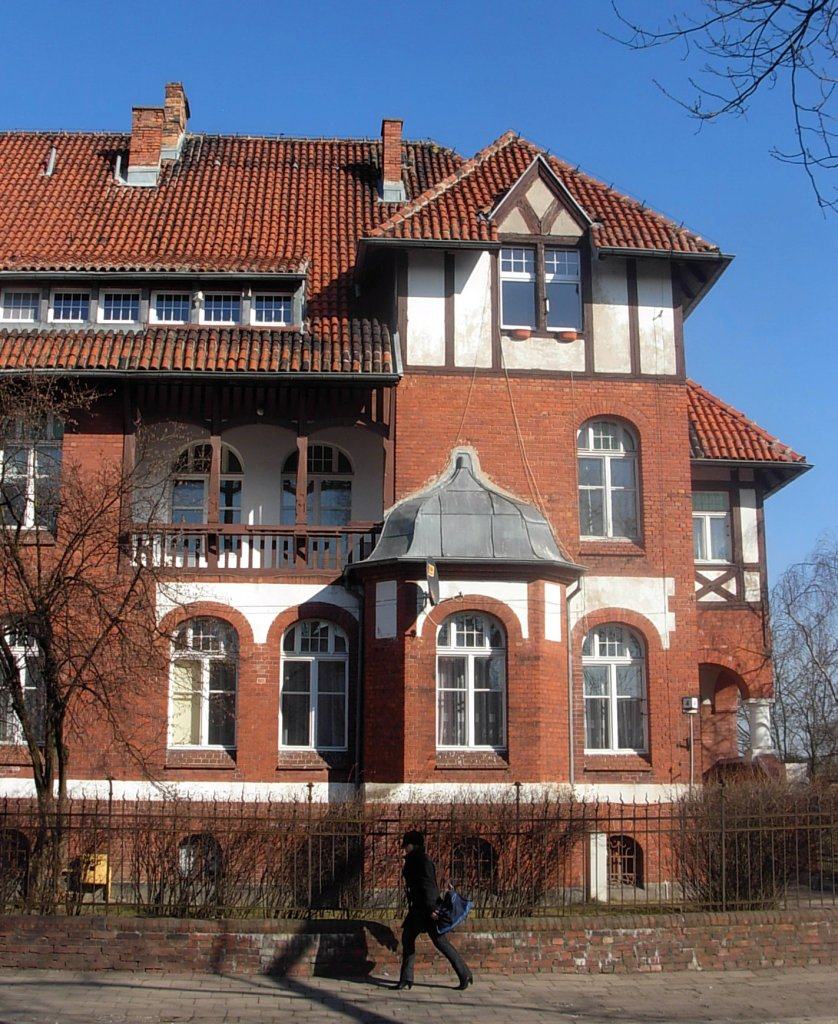
Detail of Nr.4

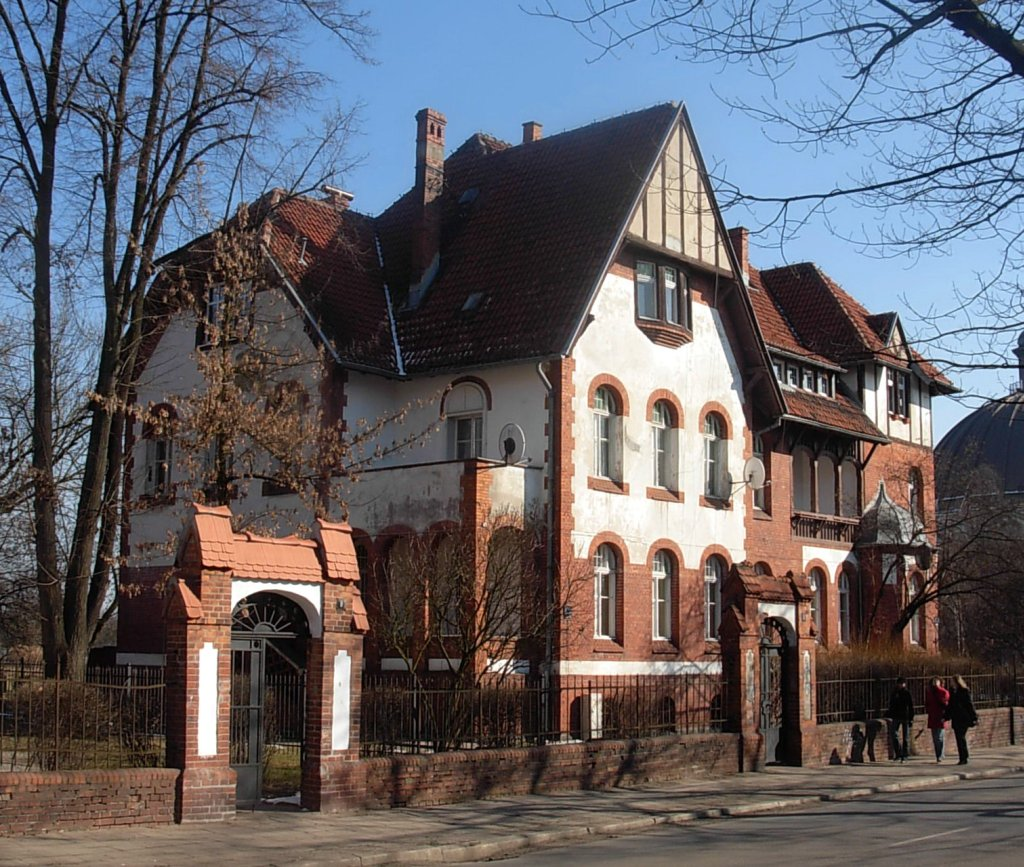
View of Nr.6 on foreground

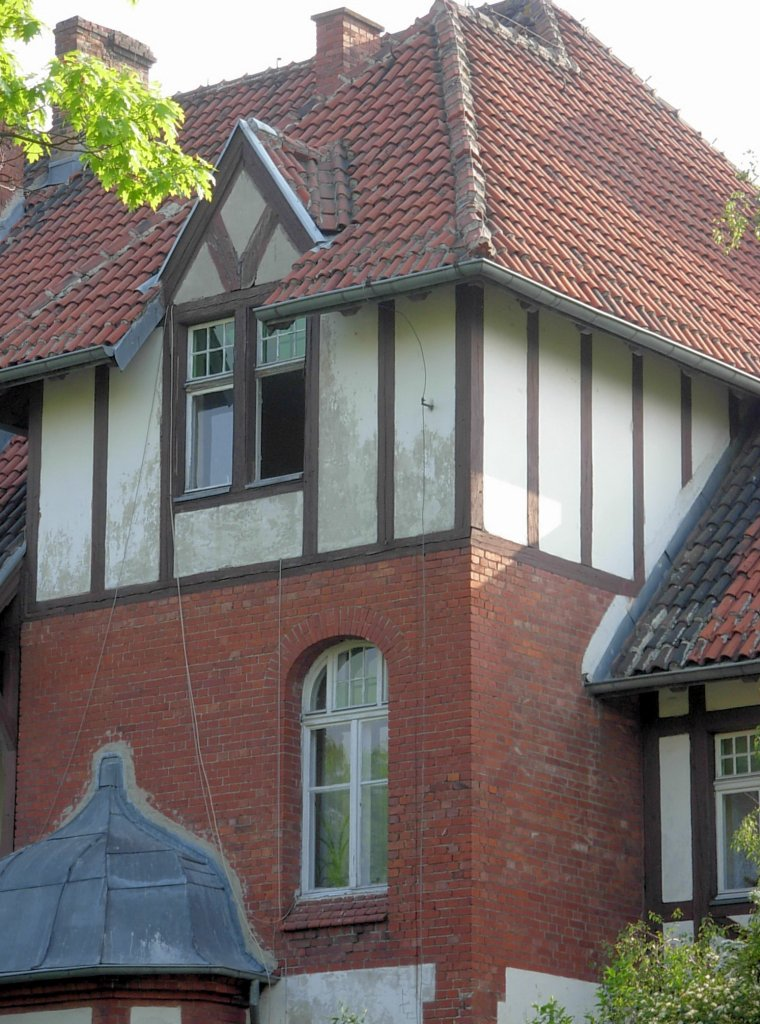
Detail of half-timbered elements

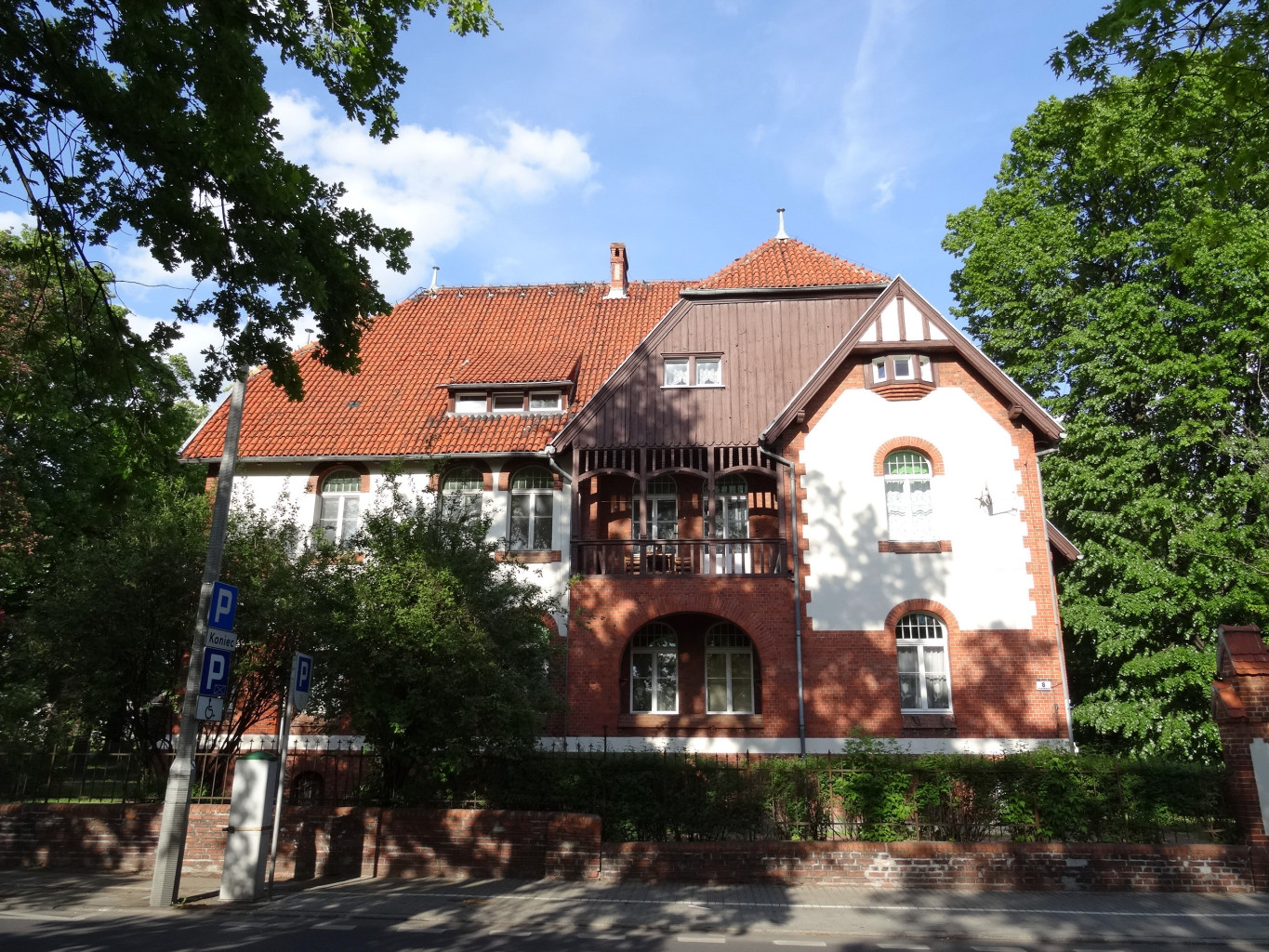
Facade of Nr.8/10

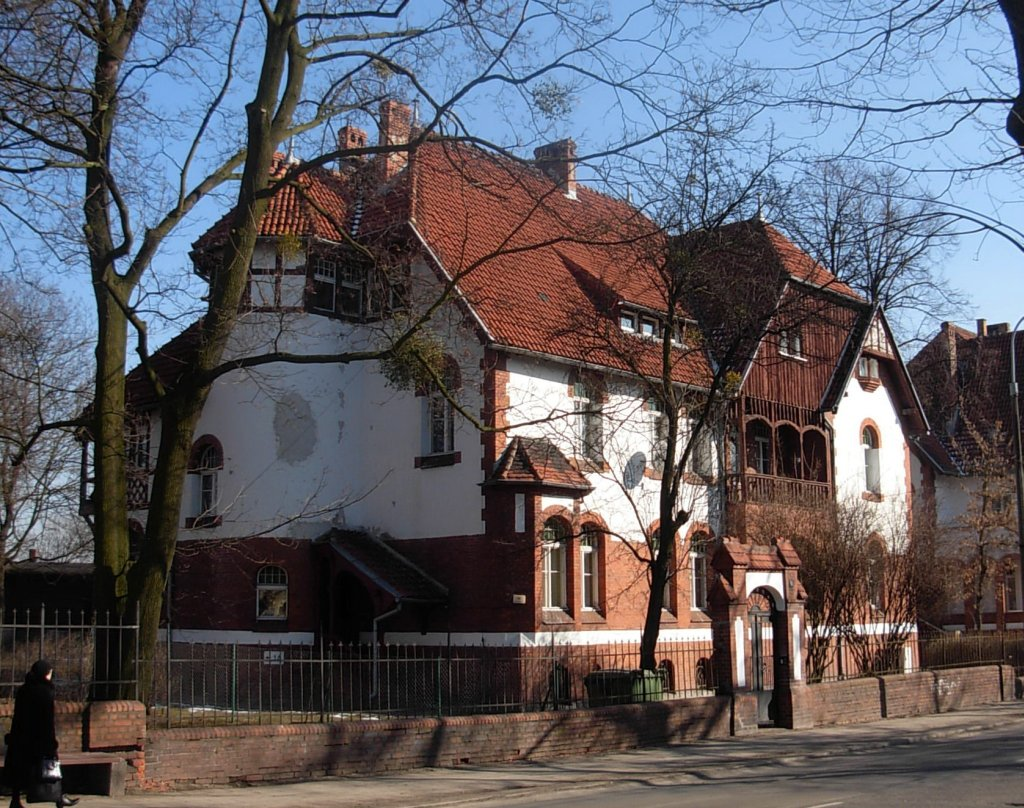
Side view of Nr.8/10

=== 12 Ossoliński Alley ===
Registered on Kuyavian-Pomeranian Voivodeship heritage list, Nr.601256, Reg.A/676/1-8, 20 May 1992.

This building originally housed the Institute of Agrochemistry and Bacteriology.

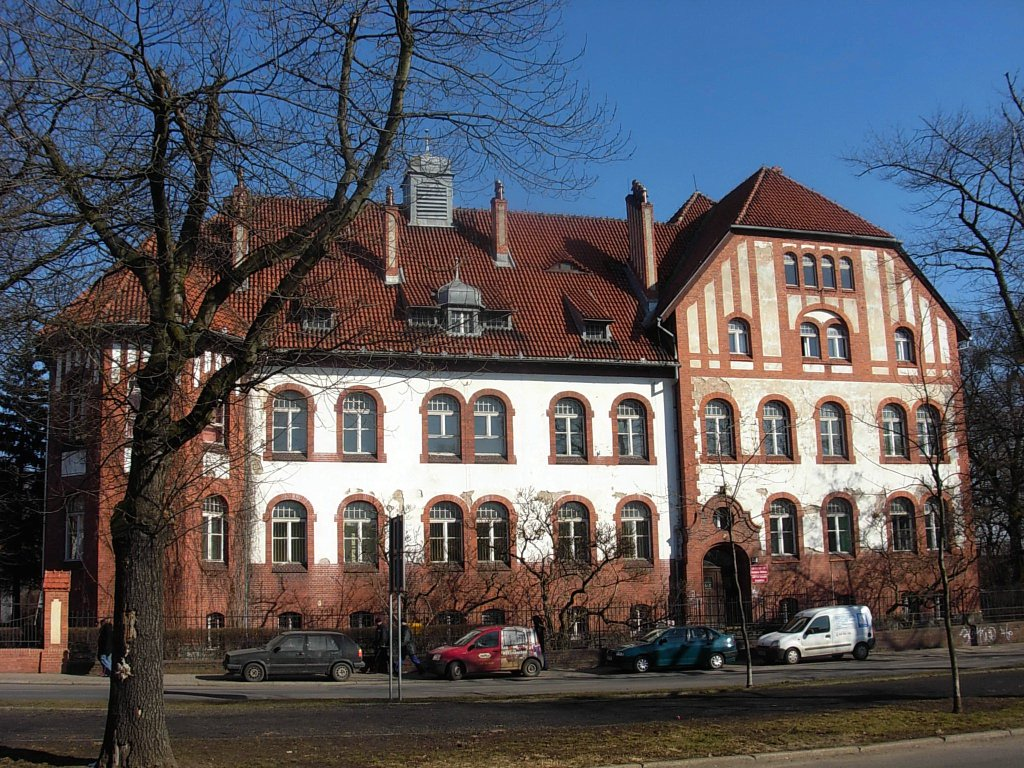
Main view from the street

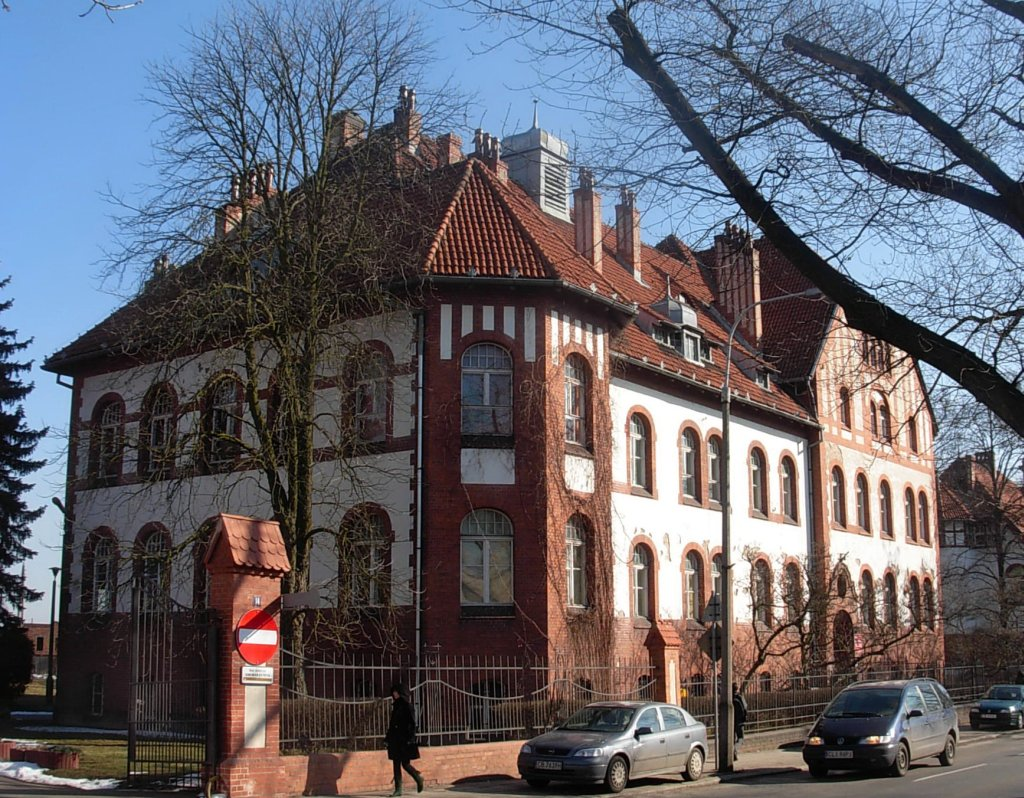
Side View

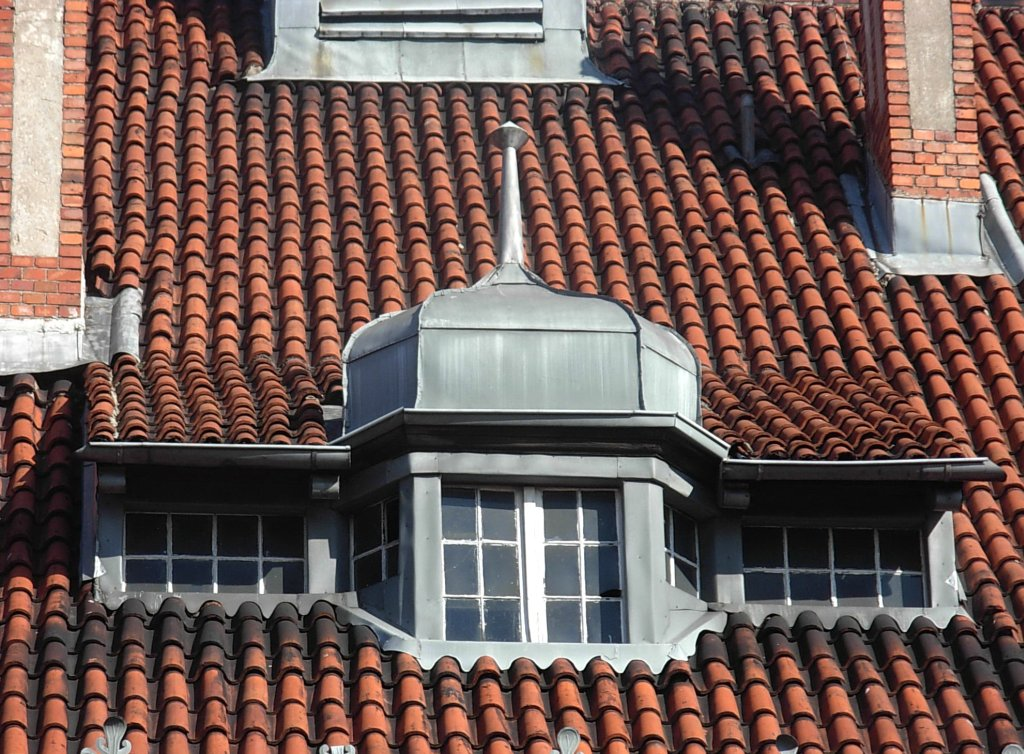
Detail of the roof

=== Villa at 5 ===
1935 by Jan Kossowski

Functionalism

The house has been designed for Ludwig Stojowski, a banker.

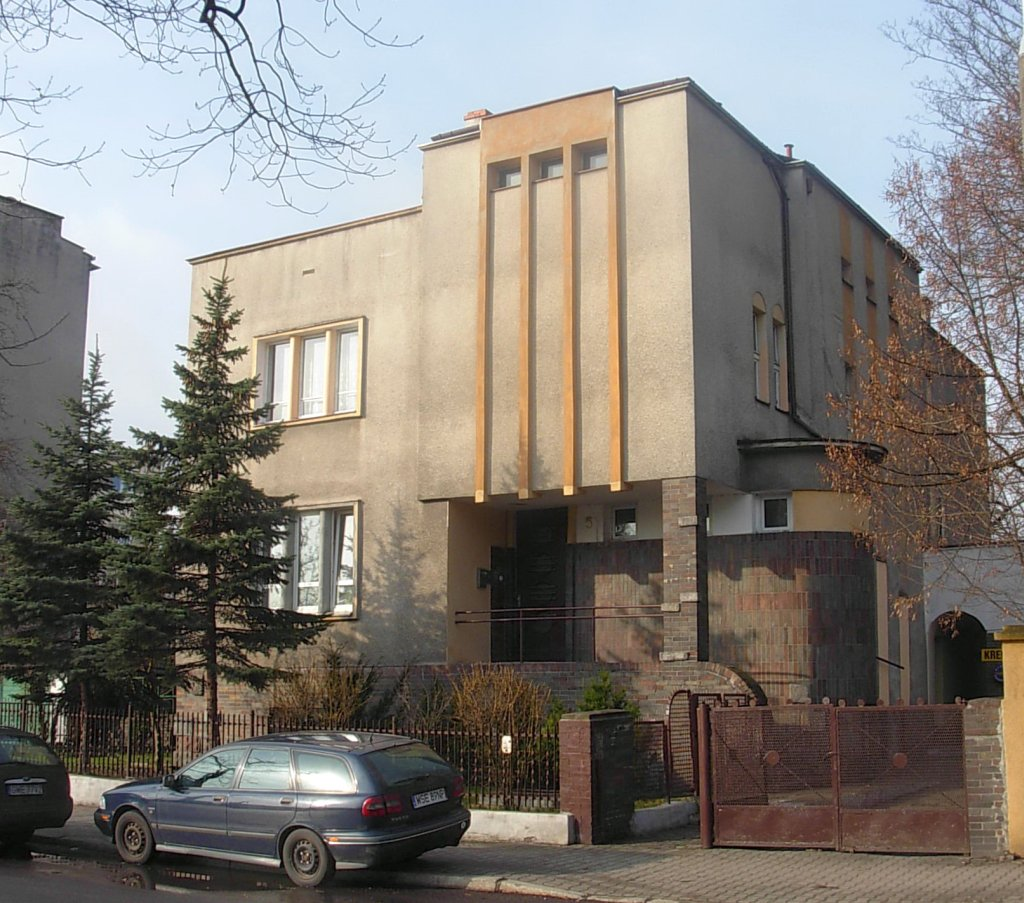
View from the street

=== Villa at 7 ===
Registered on Kuyavian-Pomeranian Voivodeship heritage list, Nr.601388, Reg. A/1050, 31 December 1997.

1927–1929 by Bronisław Jankowski

Polish National Style

This large house, (620 m^{2}), was supposed to be a residential building with a lawyer office for a famous family of Polish interwar, the Felcynów In the 1930s, the villa housed the "Headquarters District Command of Border Guard", then, during the nazi occupation, the Westpreussen seat of Selbstschutz of western Prussia. During those dark times, it also housed the Abwehr: the decoration included a series of rooms dedicated for senior military officers (spa and leisure facilities).

After World War II, it was used by NKVD, and between 1947 and 2004, a delegation of Polish Supreme Audit Office used the building. On the facade a plaque by Alexander Dętkoś, unveiled on 17 September, commemorates Polish Border Guard personnel murdered by NKVD soldiers during the Katyn massacre.

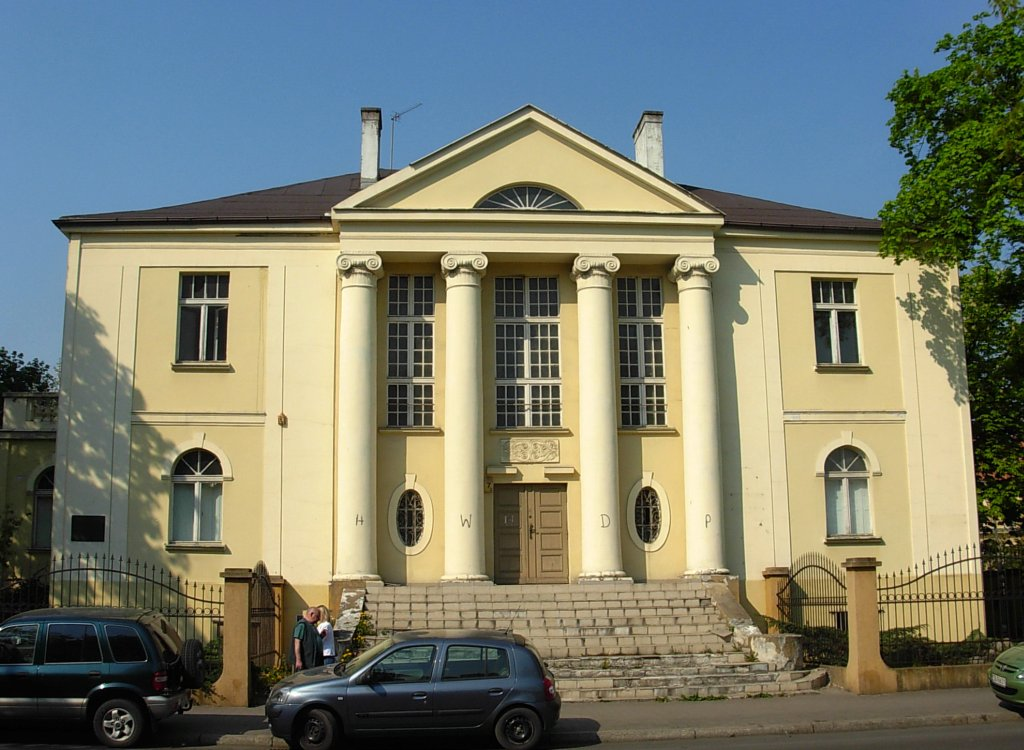
View of the front facade

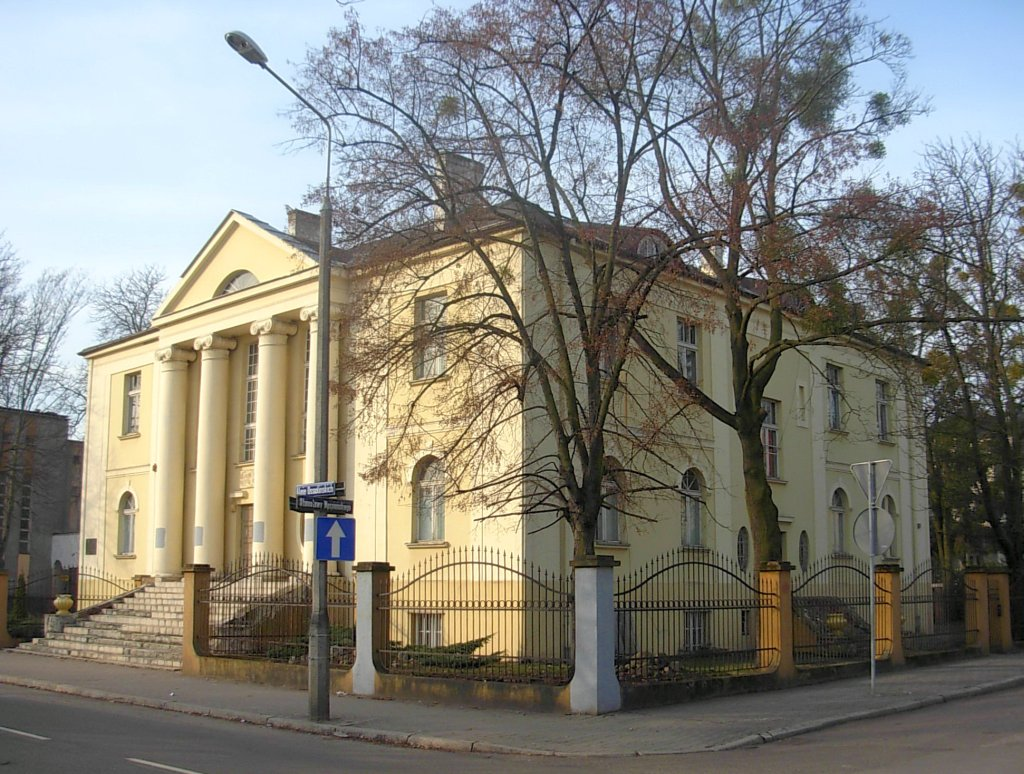
Side view

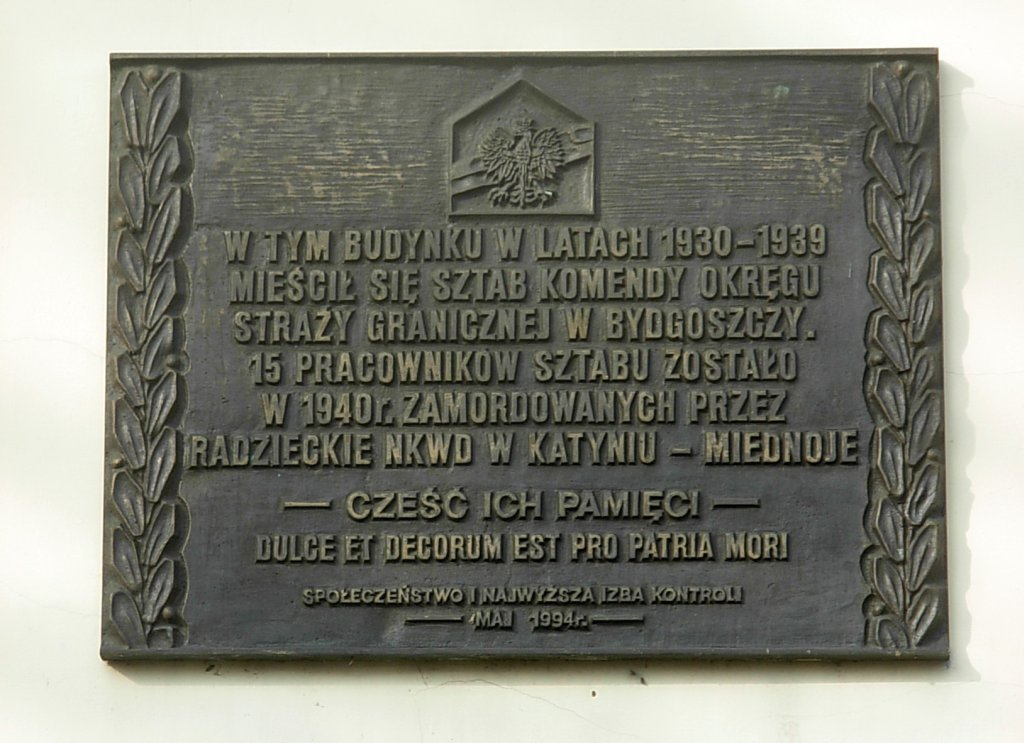
Commemorating plaque

=== Villa at 9 ===
1927–1931 by Edward Stecewicz

Functionalism

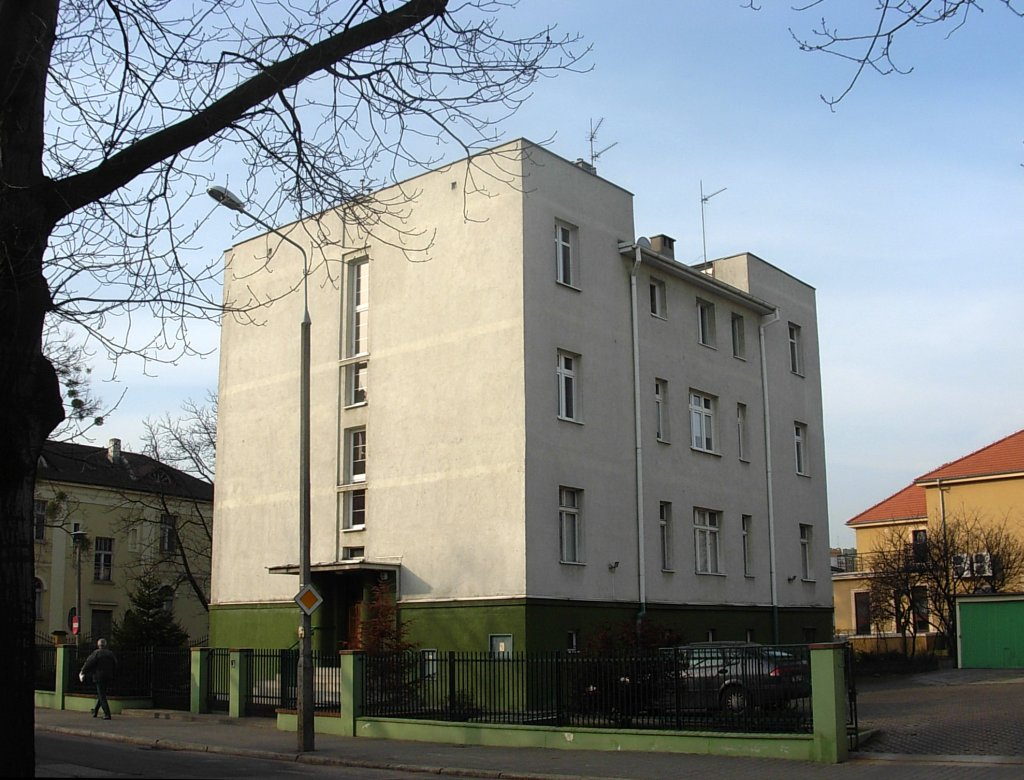
View from the street

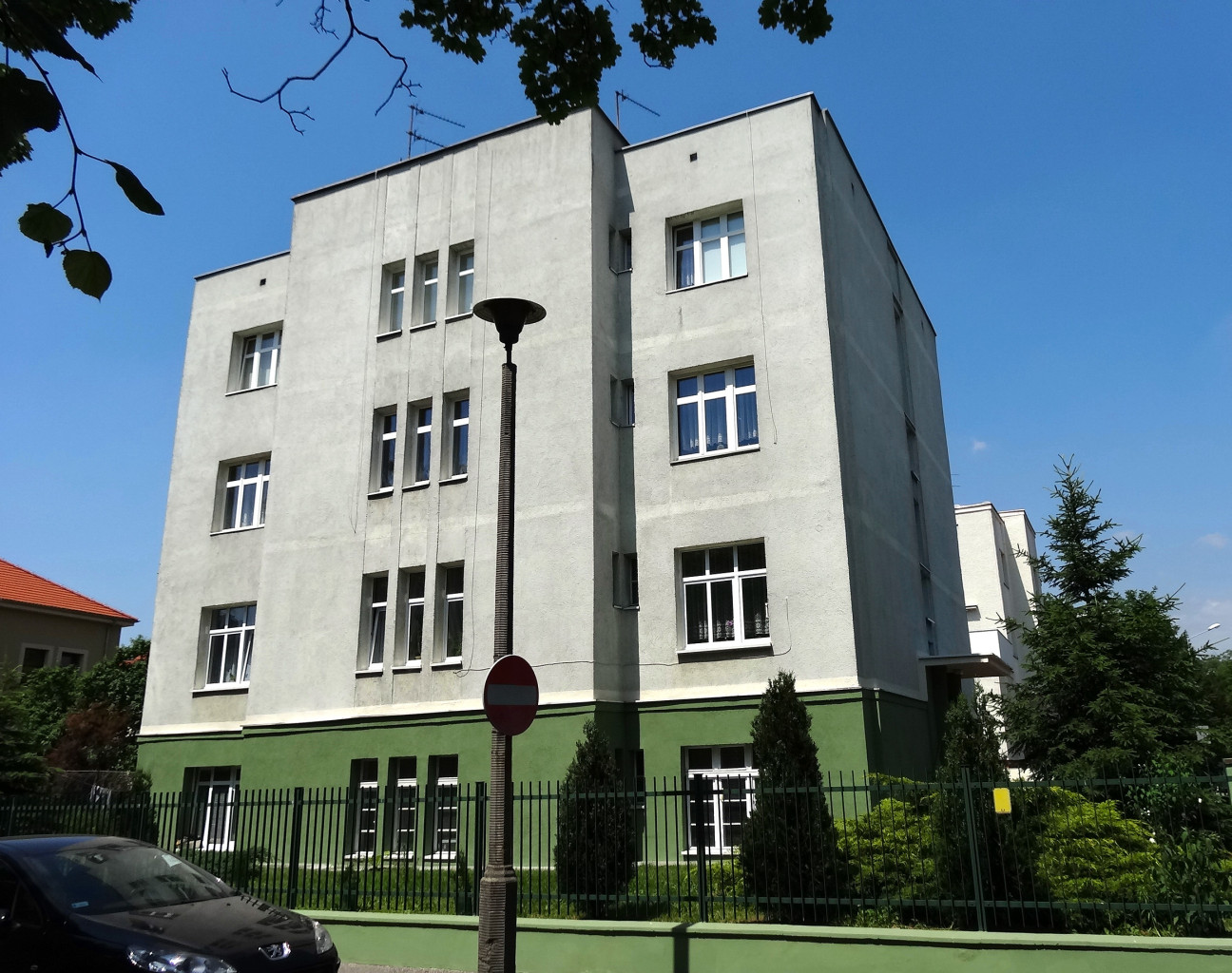
Side view

=== Villa at 11 ===
1932–1933 by Henryk Misterek

Functionalism

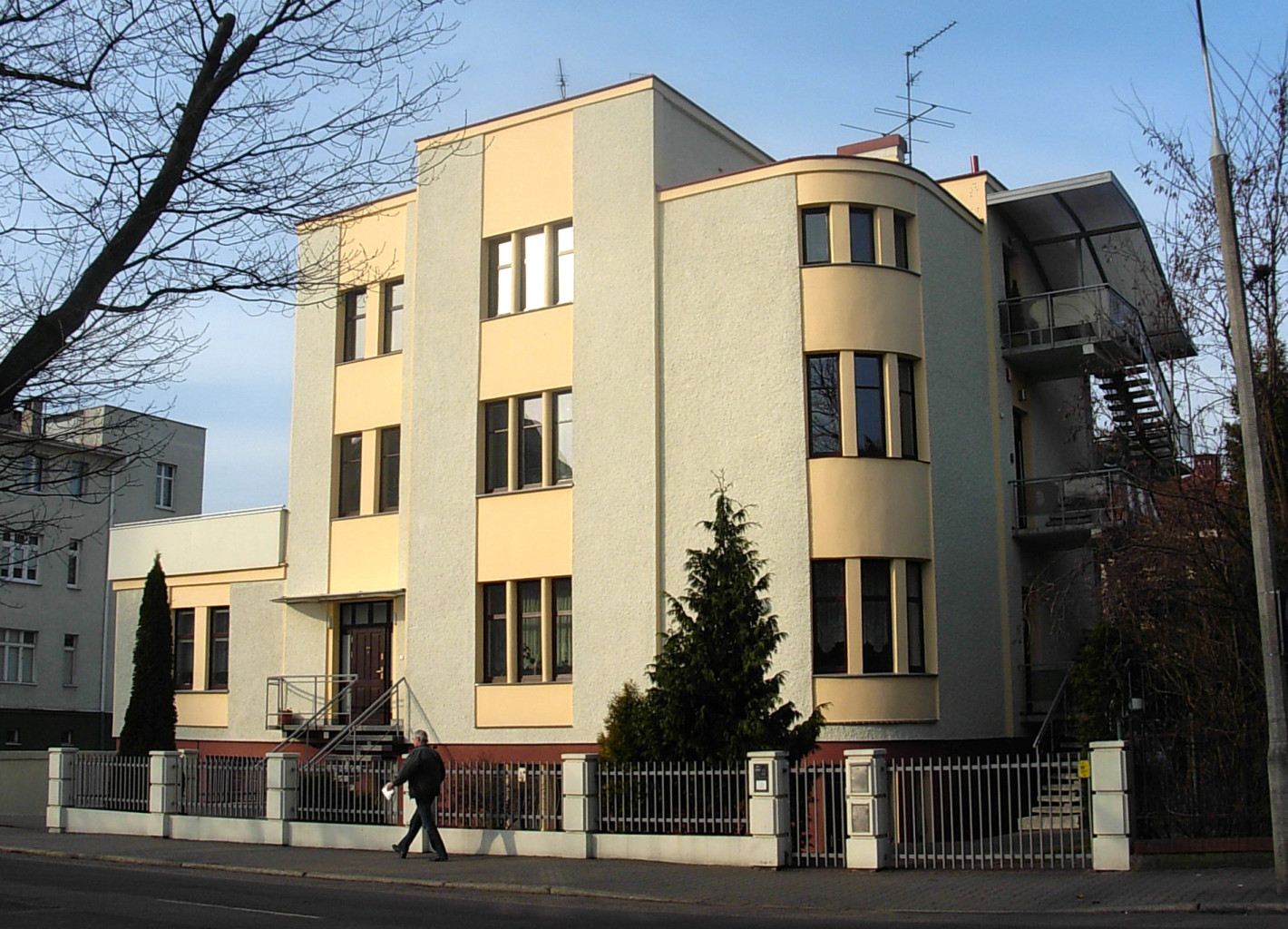
Main facade from the street

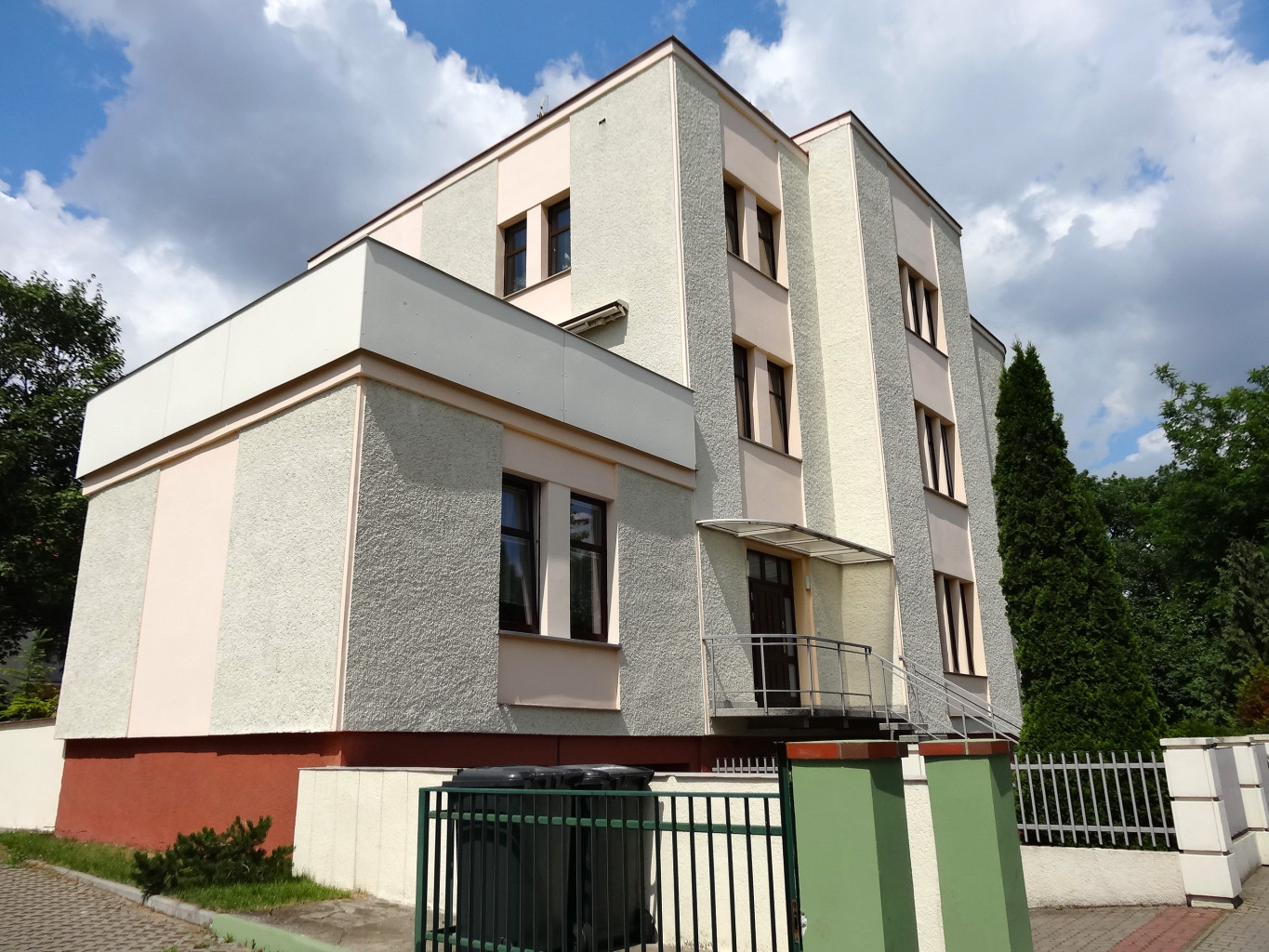
Backside view

=== Villa at 16 Kopernika Street, corner with Ossoliński Alley ===
Registered on Kuyavian-Pomeranian Voivodeship heritage list, Nr.601364, Reg. A/61/1-2, January 20, 2002

1933, by Antoni Weynerowski

Early modernism

The house has been commissioned by Antoni Weynerowski, owner of a successful shoe factory LEO', then KOBRA in the early 20th century, as a wedding gift for his son Witold and his wife Julia. She was from Dutch ascendance, hence the choice of the design, with a de l'Orme roof. After World War II, the villa moved into the hands of the city authorities and became a kindergarten for police members.

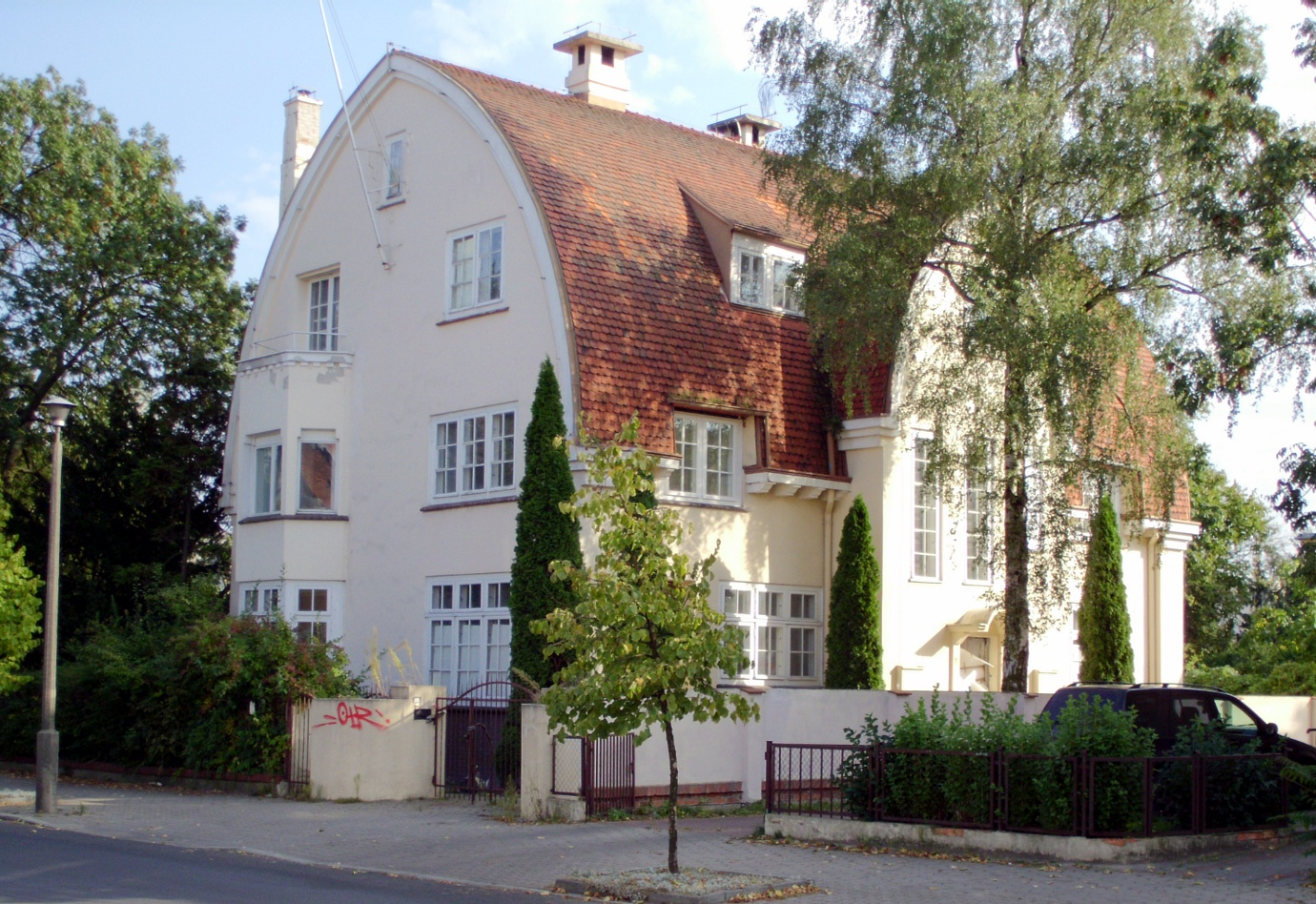
View from street intersection

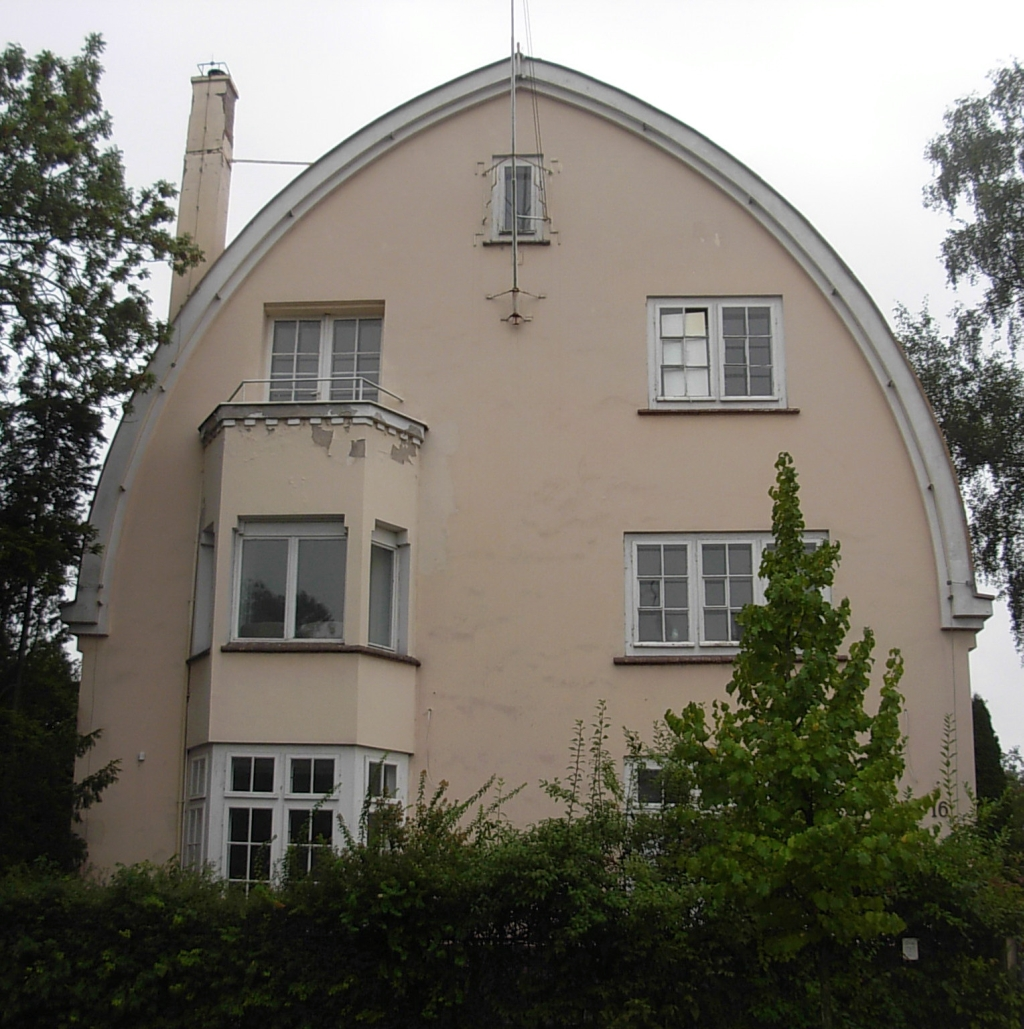
de l'Orme gable roof

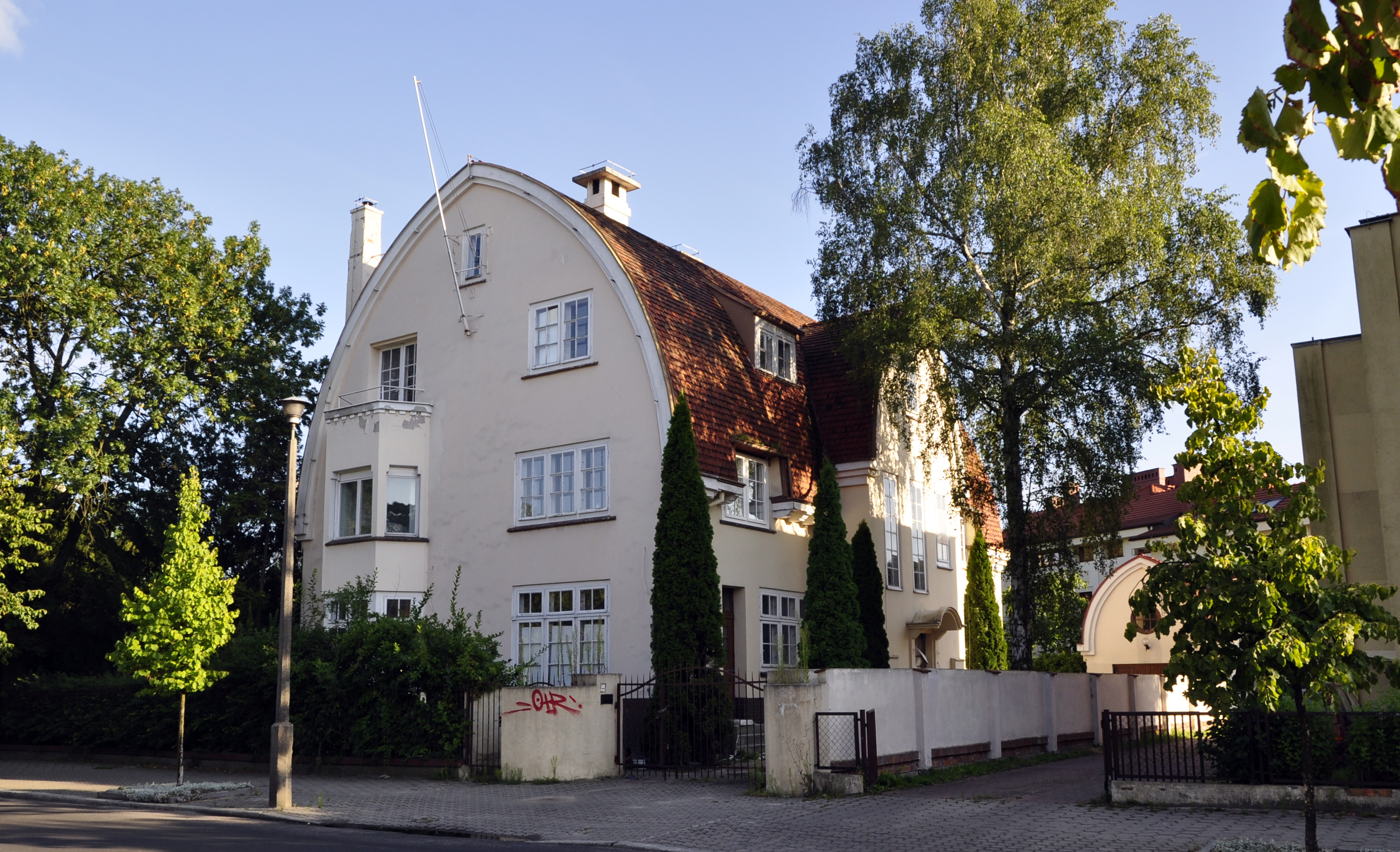
General view with the gable of the garage building on the right

=== Villa at 9 Kopernika Street, corner with Ossoliński Alley ===
1932–1933, by Bolesław Polakiewicz

Early modernism, Functionalism

In 1932–1933, Bolesław Polakiewicz realized 9 projects in the area, all characterized by functionalist style: cubic or rectangular forms with enhanced architectural effects.

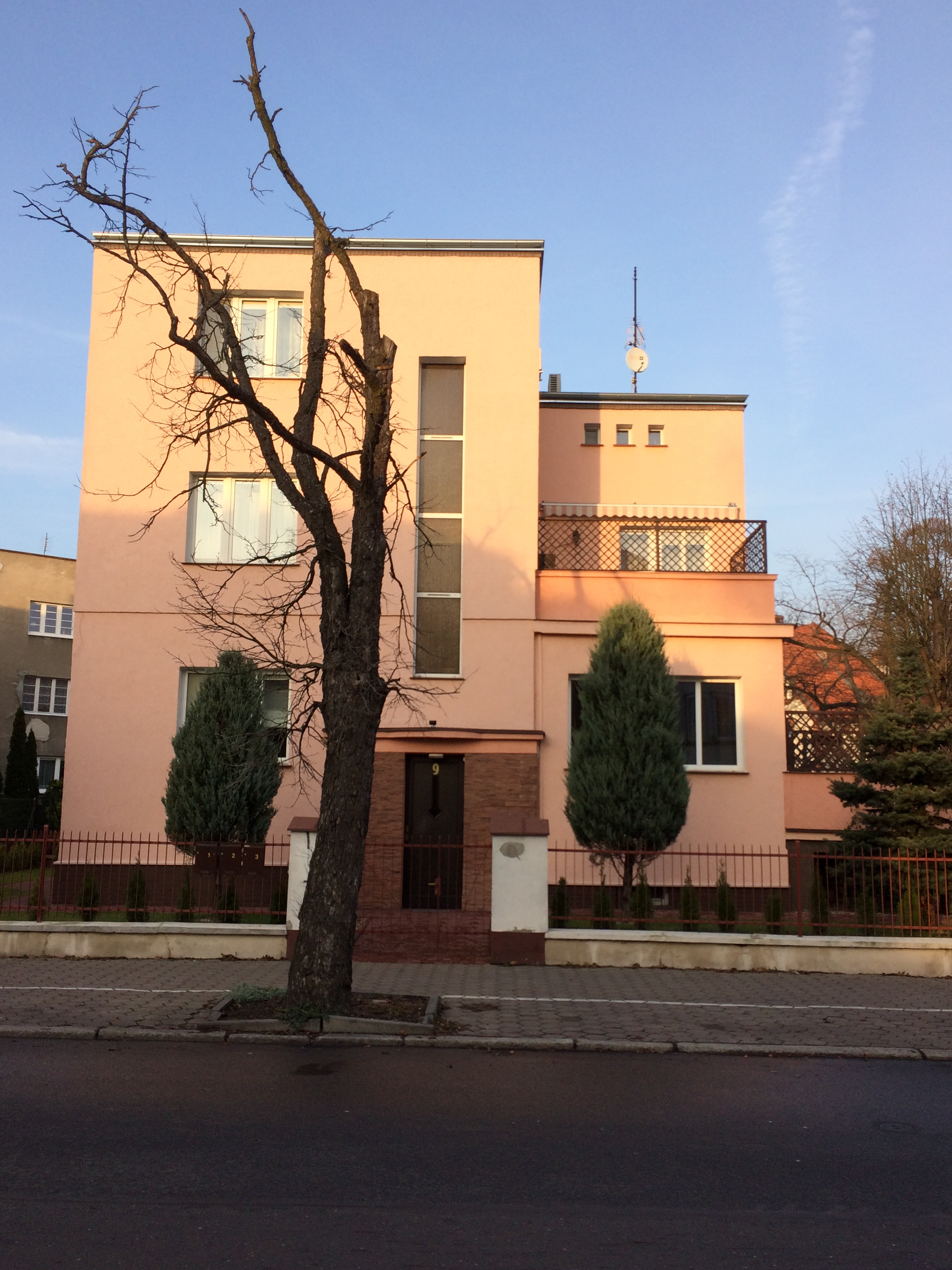
View from Kopernika Street

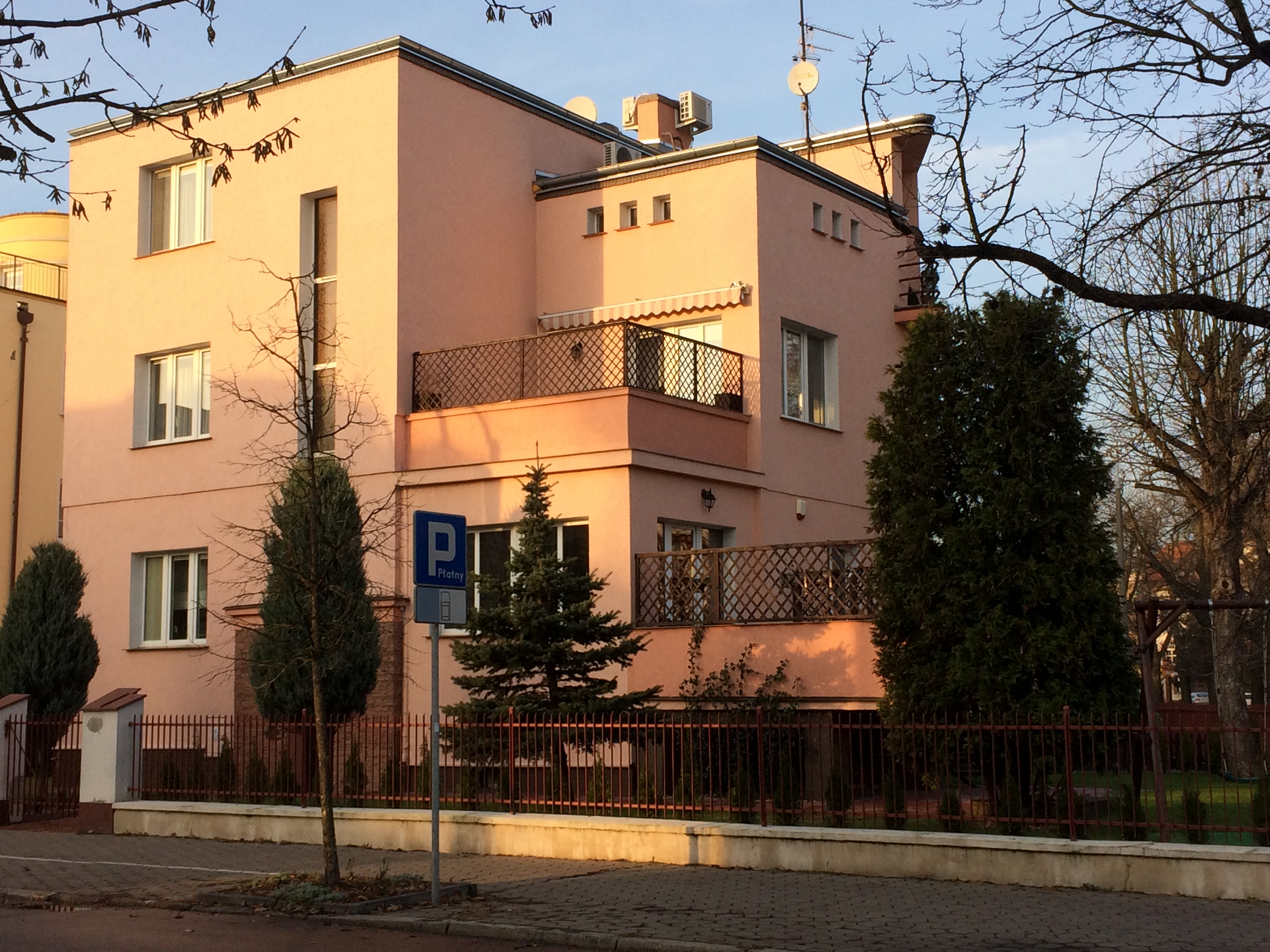
View from Ossoliński Alley

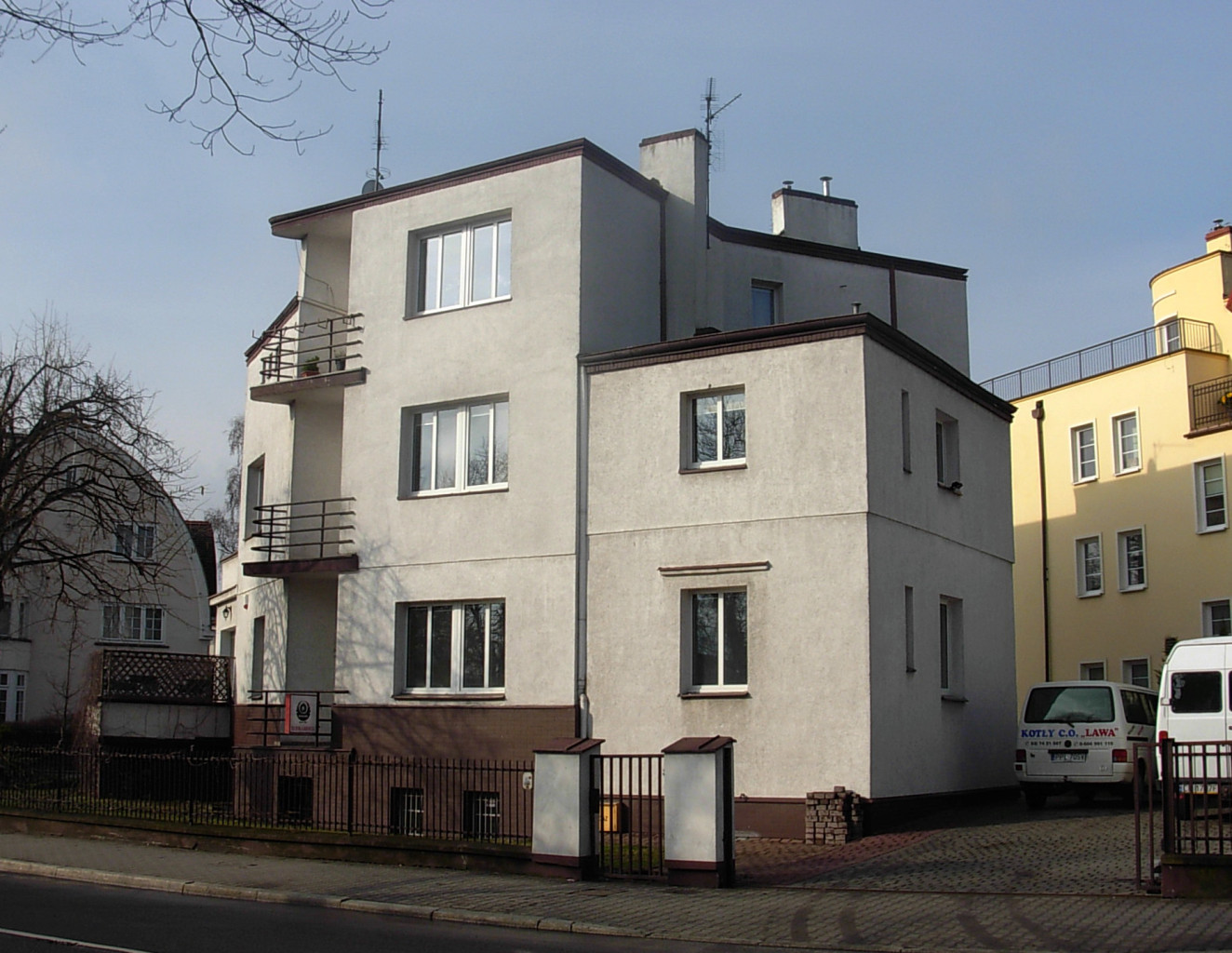
General view with Kopernika Street Nr.9 (center), 7a (right) and 16 (left)

=== Villa at 17 ===
1932–1933 by Bolesław Polakiewicz

Functionalism

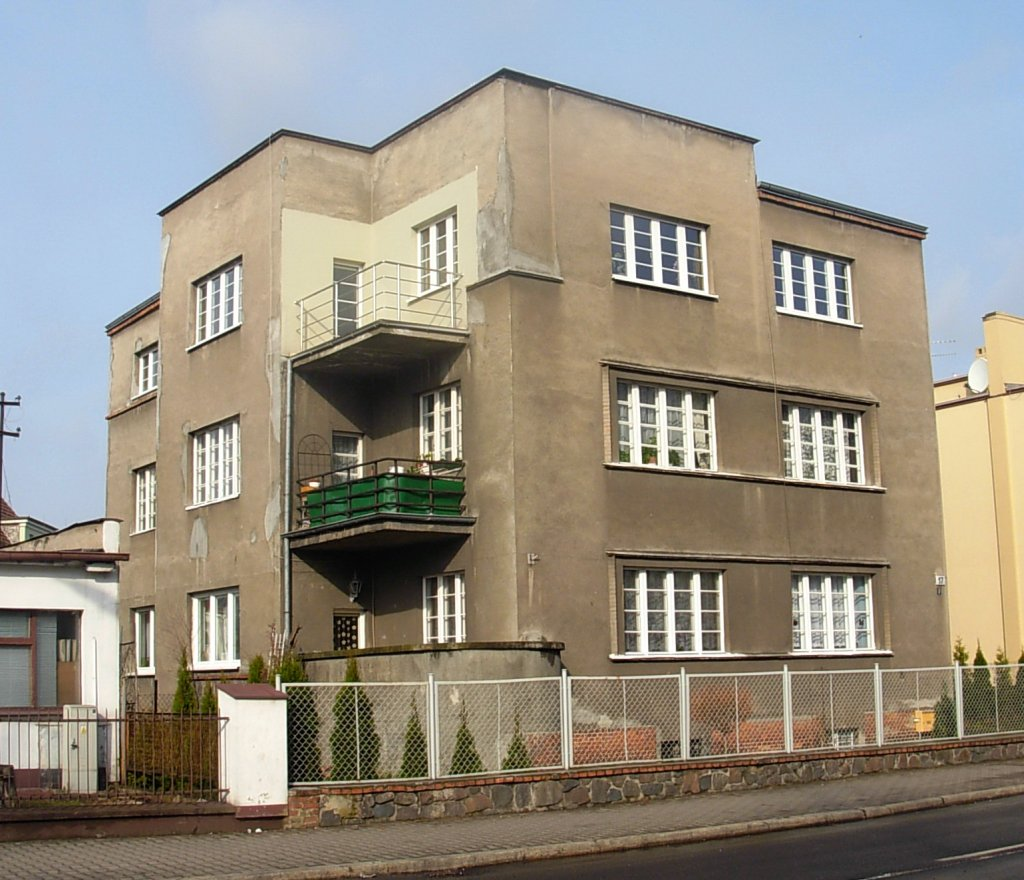
Main facade from the street

=== Villa at 19 ===
1932–1933 by Bolesław Polakiewicz

Functionalism

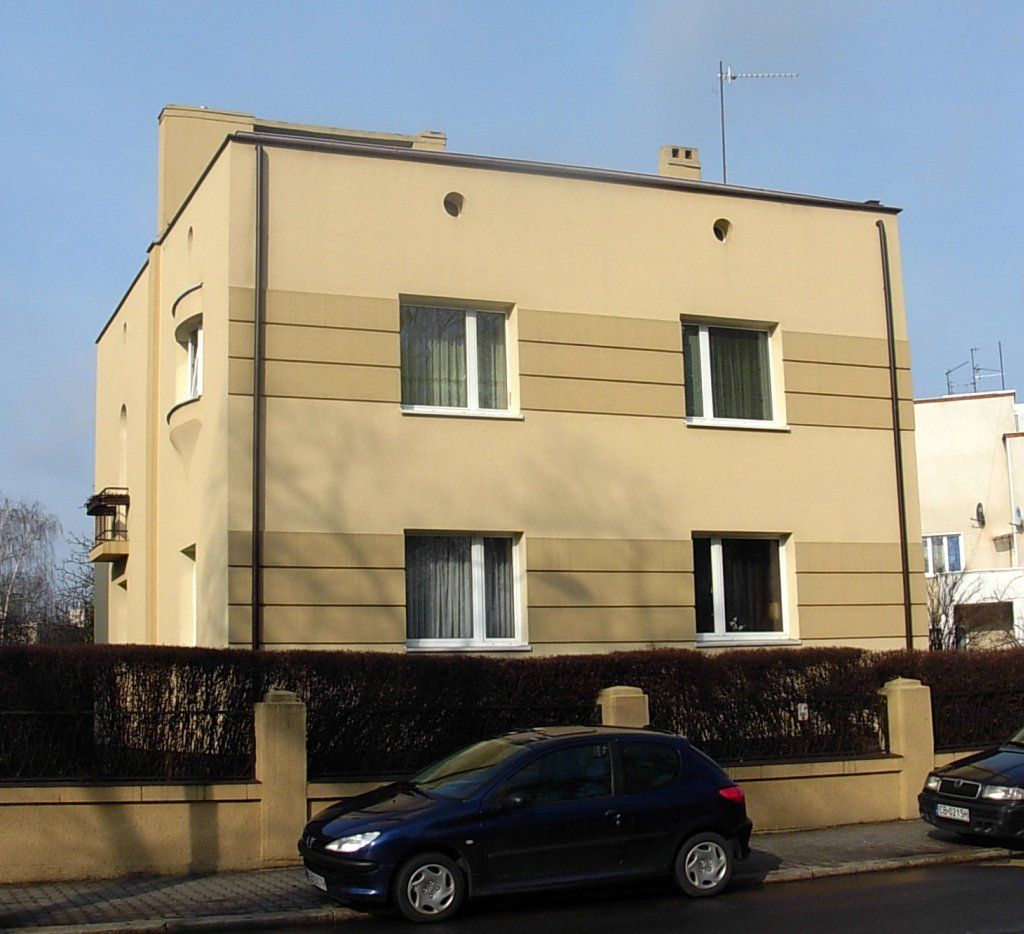
Main facade from the street

=== Villa at 21 ===
1932–1933 by Bolesław Polakiewicz

Functionalism

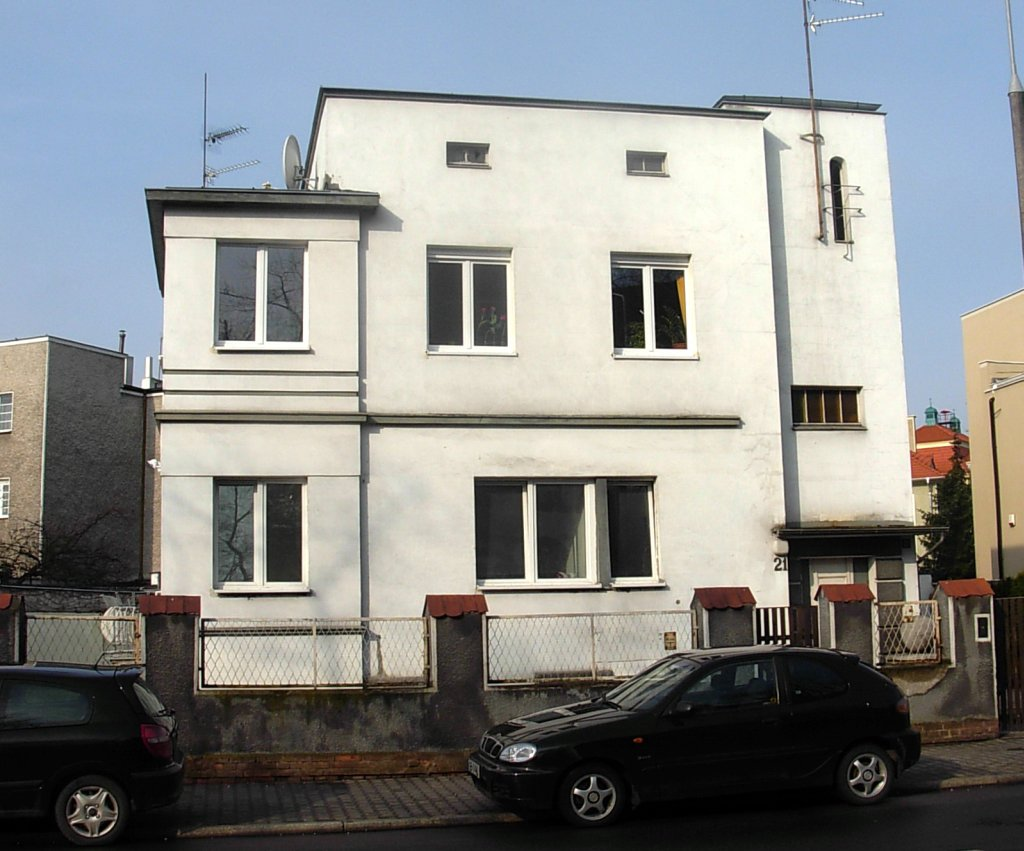
Main facade from the street

=== Villa at 23, corner with 6 Asnyka street ===
1933–1934, by Jan Kossowski

Functionalism

One of the houses part of the Sielanka estate project in the 1930s.

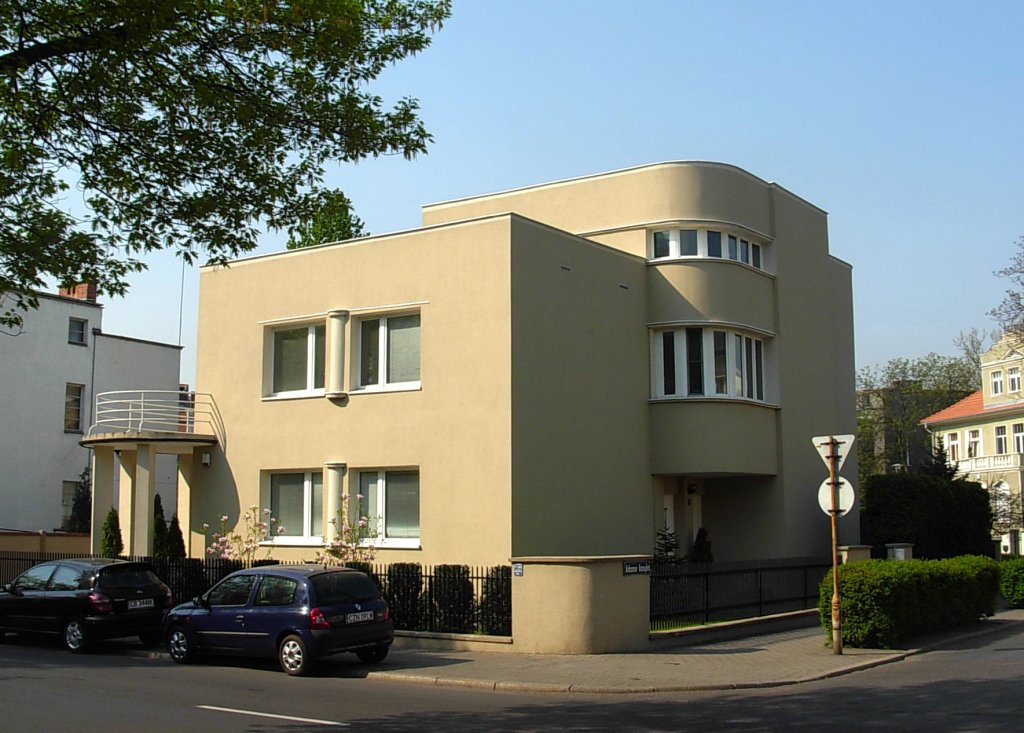
View from Ossoliński Alley

=== Villa at 25 ===
1927–1929 by Bronisław Jankowski

Polish National Style

Houses a local branch of a bank.

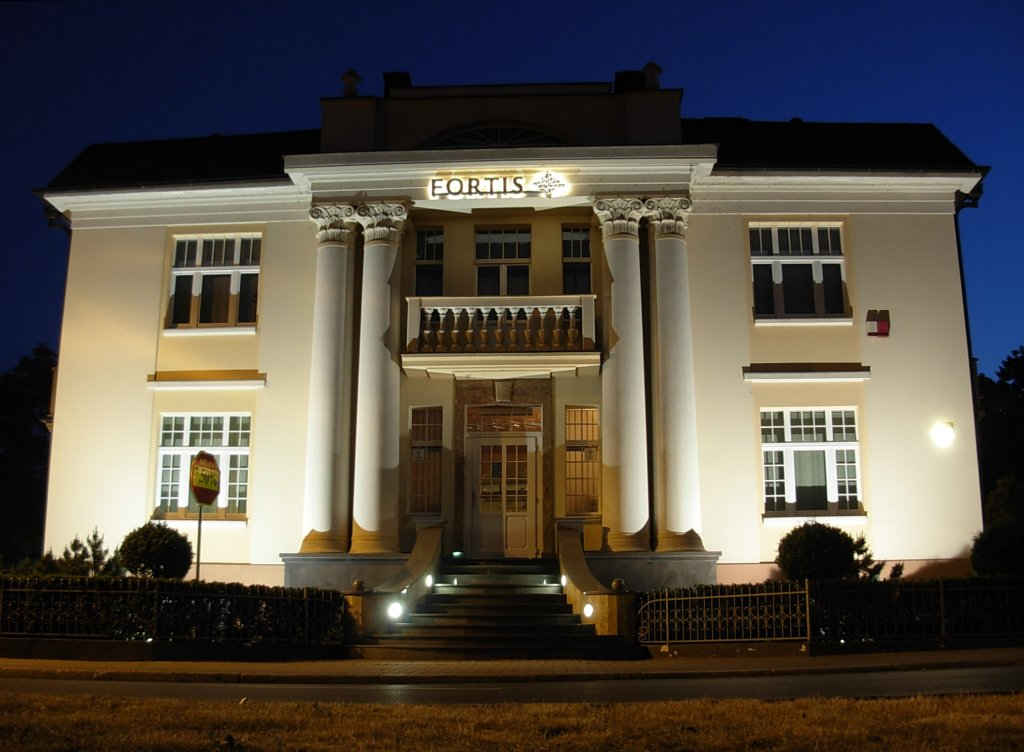
Main facade by night

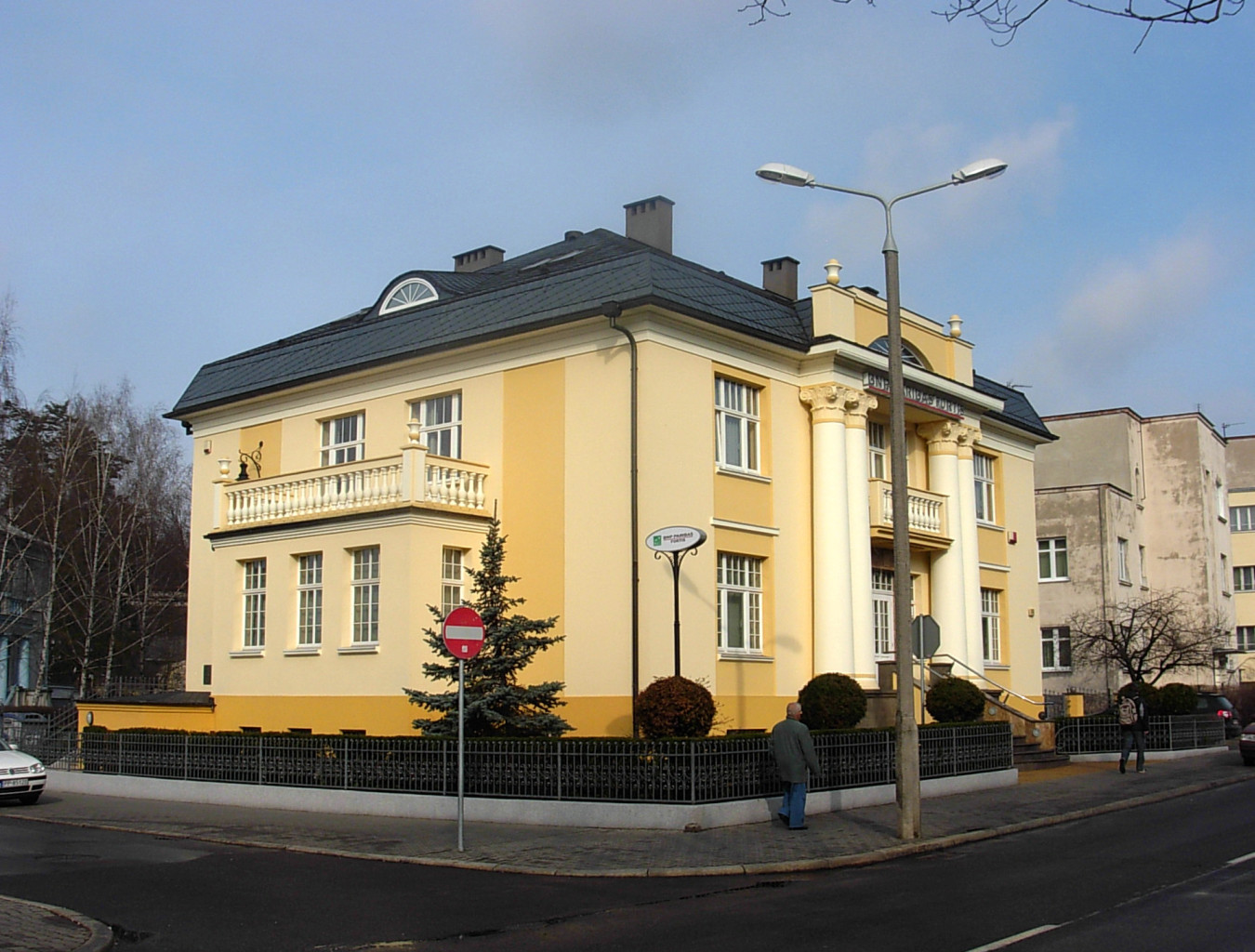
Side view

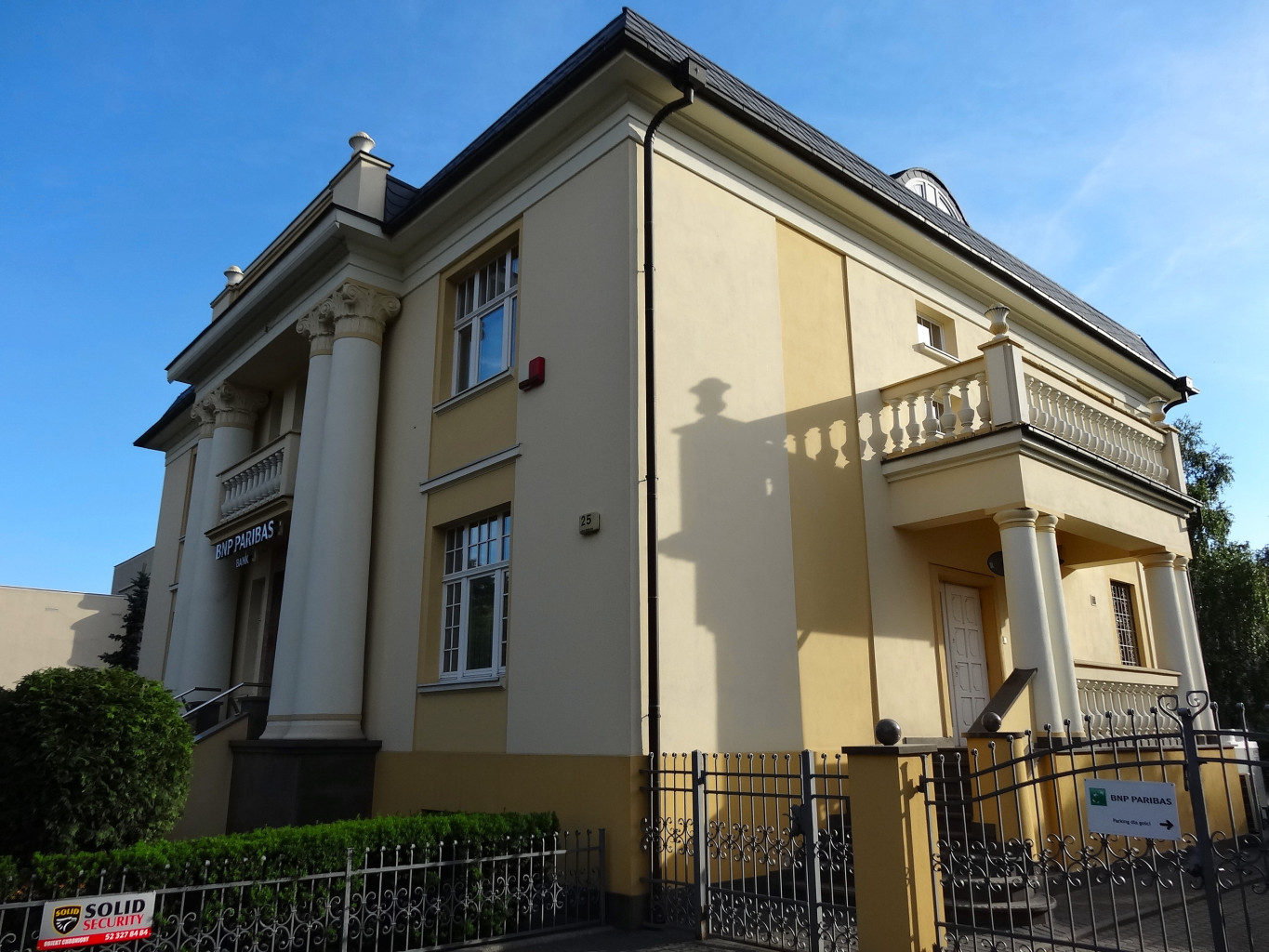
Side view
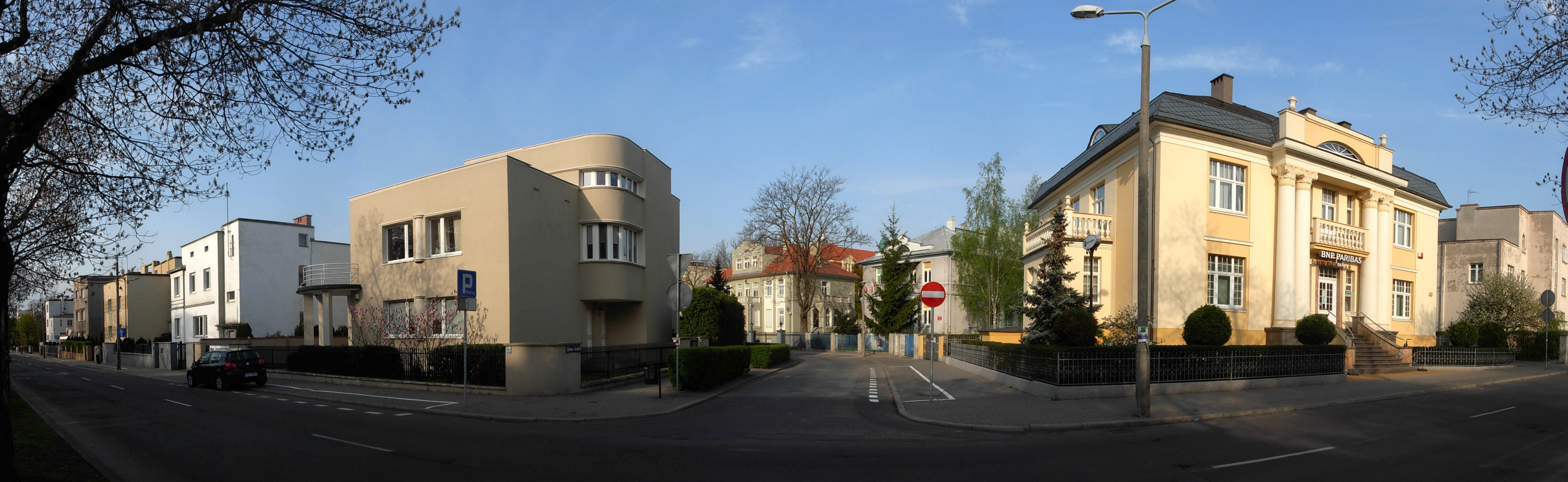
Panorama of villas in Ossoliński Alley

== See also ==
- Kopernika Street in Bydgoszcz
- St. Vincent de Paul Basilica Minor in Bydgoszcz
- Pomeranian Philharmonic
- Gdańska Street, Bydgoszcz
- Adam Mickiewicz Alley in Bydgoszcz
- Józef Weyssenhoff Square in Bydgoszcz
- Bydgoszcz

== Bibliography ==
- (in Polish) Kaczmarczyk, Henryk (1996). Budynek przy alei Ossolińskich. Kalendarz Bydgoski. Bydgoszcz: Towarzystwo Miłośników Miasta Bydgoszczy. pp. 111–113.
- (in Polish) Czachorowski, Antoni (1997). Atlas historyczny miast polskich. Tom II Kujawy. Zeszyt I Bydgoszcz. Toruń: Uniwersytet Mikołaja Kopernika.
- (in Polish) Jastrzębska-Puzowska, Iwona (2005). Od miasteczka do metropolii. Rozwój architektoniczny i urbanistyczny Bydgoszczy w latach 1850-1920. Toruń: Wydawnictwo MADO. ISBN 9788389886385.
- (in Polish) Umiński, Janusz (1996). Bydgoszcz – przewodnik. Bydgoszcz: Regionalny Oddział PTTK „Szlak Brdy”.
- (in Polish) Sroka CM, Zbigniew. Bazylika św. Wincentego à Paulo w Bydgoszczy – przewodnik. Bydgoszcz.
- (in Polish) A. Konsek CM, ks. A. Strycharz CM (1999). Bydgoska Bazylika Mniejsza św. Wincentego à Paulo 1924 – 1999. Bydgoszcz.
