= Josef Stübben =

German architect and urban planner

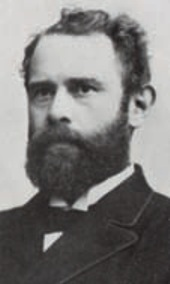
Josef Stübben (before 1888)

Hermann Josef Stübben (10 February 1845 in Hülchrath – 8 December 1936 in Frankfurt am Main) was a German architect and urban planner, one of the best-known theorists and practitioners in Germany at the end of the 19th century.

Stübben studied at Berlin's Bauakademie from 1864. He served as the chief planner of the city of Cologne between 1881 and 1898. His 1890 handbook of city planning Der Städtebau, has been influenced by Haussmann's renovation of Paris and Camillo Sitte's book City Planning According to Artistic Principles.

Stübben also worked extensively in Poland. Part of his work in the historic core of Poznań in the early 20th century is recognized in its listing as one of Poland's official national Historic Monuments (Pomnik historii), as designated on 13 November 2012.

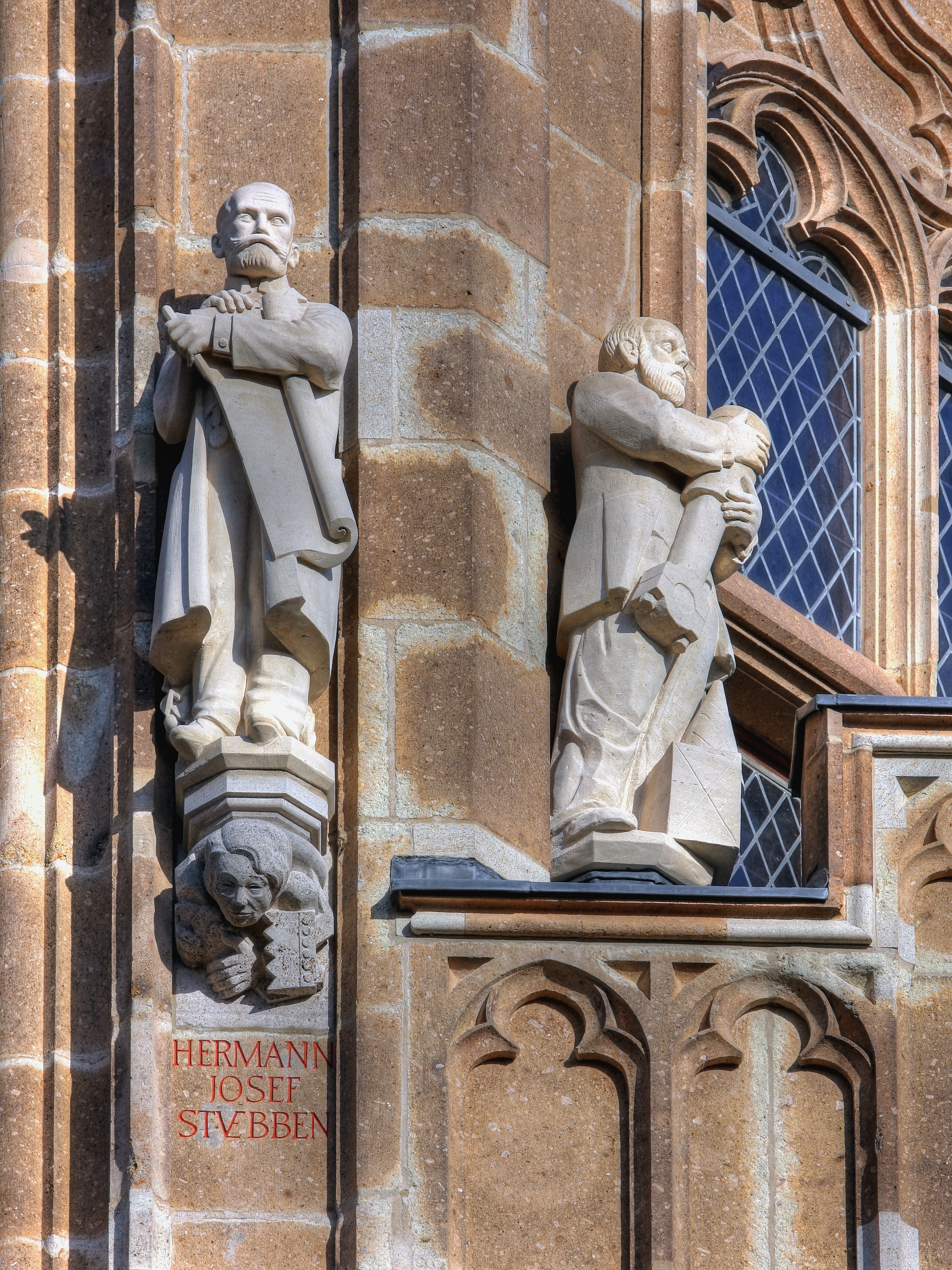
Stübben memorialized in the architectural sculpture of the restored tower of the Cologne City Hall
