= Bydgoszcz Architects (1850–1970s) =

Polish architectural firm

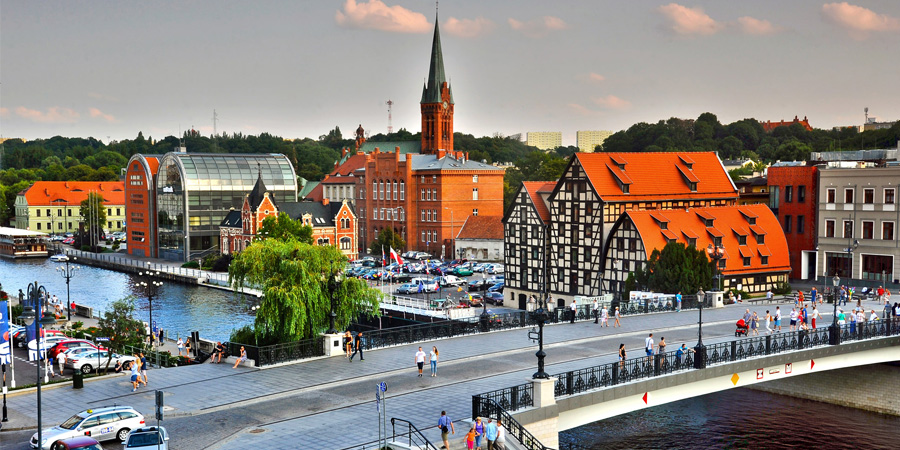
- View of Old town
- Occupation: Architect
- Design: Eclecticism, Art Nouveau, Modern architecture

Bydgoszcz displays an abundant variety of architectures, with styles from neo-gothic, neo-baroque and neoclassicism, to Art Nouveau and modernism; hence its nickname of Little Berlin at the start of the 20th century. The notable granaries on Mill Island and along Brda river also recall a recognized timber-framed characteristics of the city in Poland.

The period stretching from 1850 to the Second Polish Republic witnessed the greatest development of the city. In the mid-19th century, the arrival of the Prussian Eastern Railway (German: Preußische Ostbahn) contributed greatly to the development of Bromberg. After WWI, with the re-attachment of the town to the new state of Poland, Bydgoszcz underwent anew a growth, while German residents fled.

Most of the constructions of these time, still preserved today, are linked to a number of architects who left (for a few of them) a profound mark on the current architectural landscape of the city.

== Prussian Period (1850–1918) ==
=== City construction advisors ===
During Prussian Partition, Bromberg fell under Prussian law, in particular regarding construction matter, which was organized with a strictly defined hierarchy. On top were builders and architects with great competences and skills, chosen to act as municipal construction councilors. The position of building consultant was one of the most important in the city administration. This advisor participated in almost all areas of Bromberg public life, from security, transport to urban land management and development. Building councilors supervised all construction activities within the city premises, but also developed plans for official buildings funded from municipal budget. They were independent, but nevertheless cooperated actively in the city council. From 1871 to 1920, Bromberg authorities nominated five municipal construction councilors.

==== Heinrich Grüder (1871–1877) ====
He succeeded to city building advisor von Müller, who designed the blueprint of the edifice at 9 Jagiellońska street in Bydgoszcz (today, it houses the seat of the Kujawsko-Pomorskie Centre for Education and Kuyavian-Pomeranian Voivodeship Marshal's Office). Heinrich Grüder took up function as municipal construction adviser on November 16, 1871. He was educated as a master bricklayer in Mecklenburg, before moving in 1860, to work for a few months in Vienna. He came to Bromberg via Osnabrück, where he worked as a builder. Little is known about his activities in Bydgoszcz. Grüder is thought to have designed the school building project at 2 Konarskiego street (today Bydgoszcz School of Fine Arts), together with its gymnasium at Nr.4. In the years 1872–1876, he conducted the erection of the Evangelical church on Weltzin Place (nowadays Plac Wolności), on a design by Berlin architect Friedrich Adler. Appreciated for his professionalism, Grüder left Bromberg to Poznań in October 1877 where he worked as city advisor.

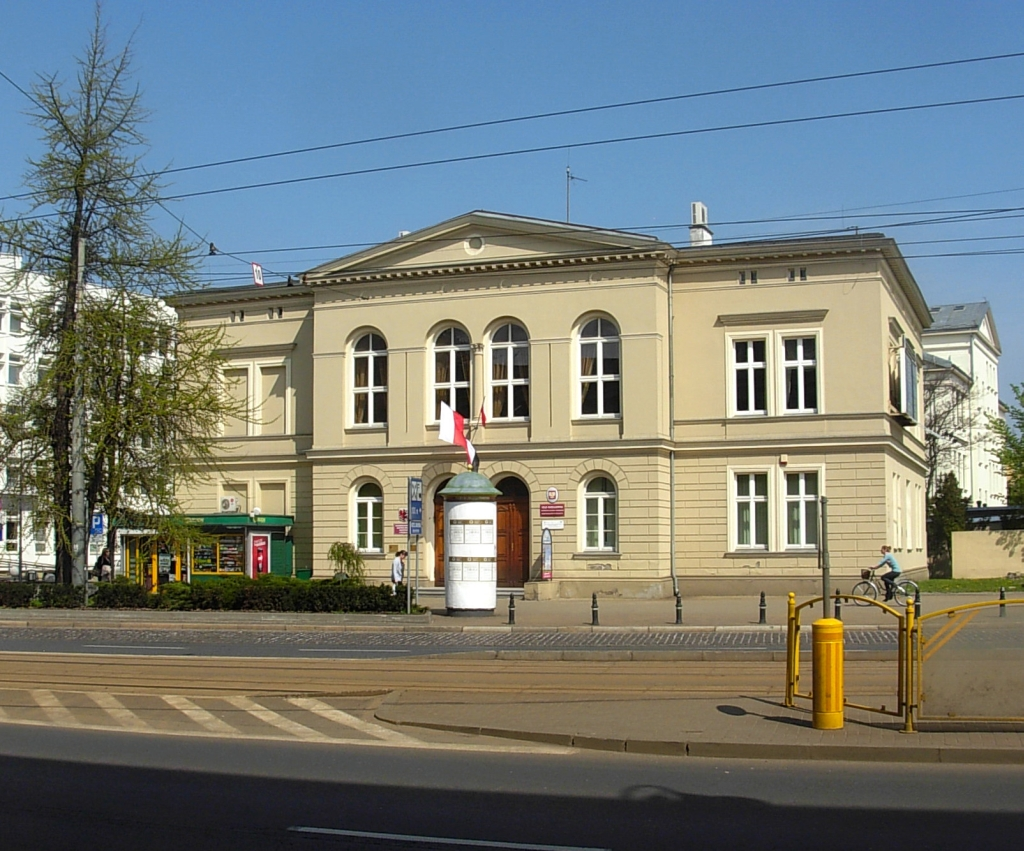
Building at 9 Jagiellońska street, design by von Müller (ca 1865)

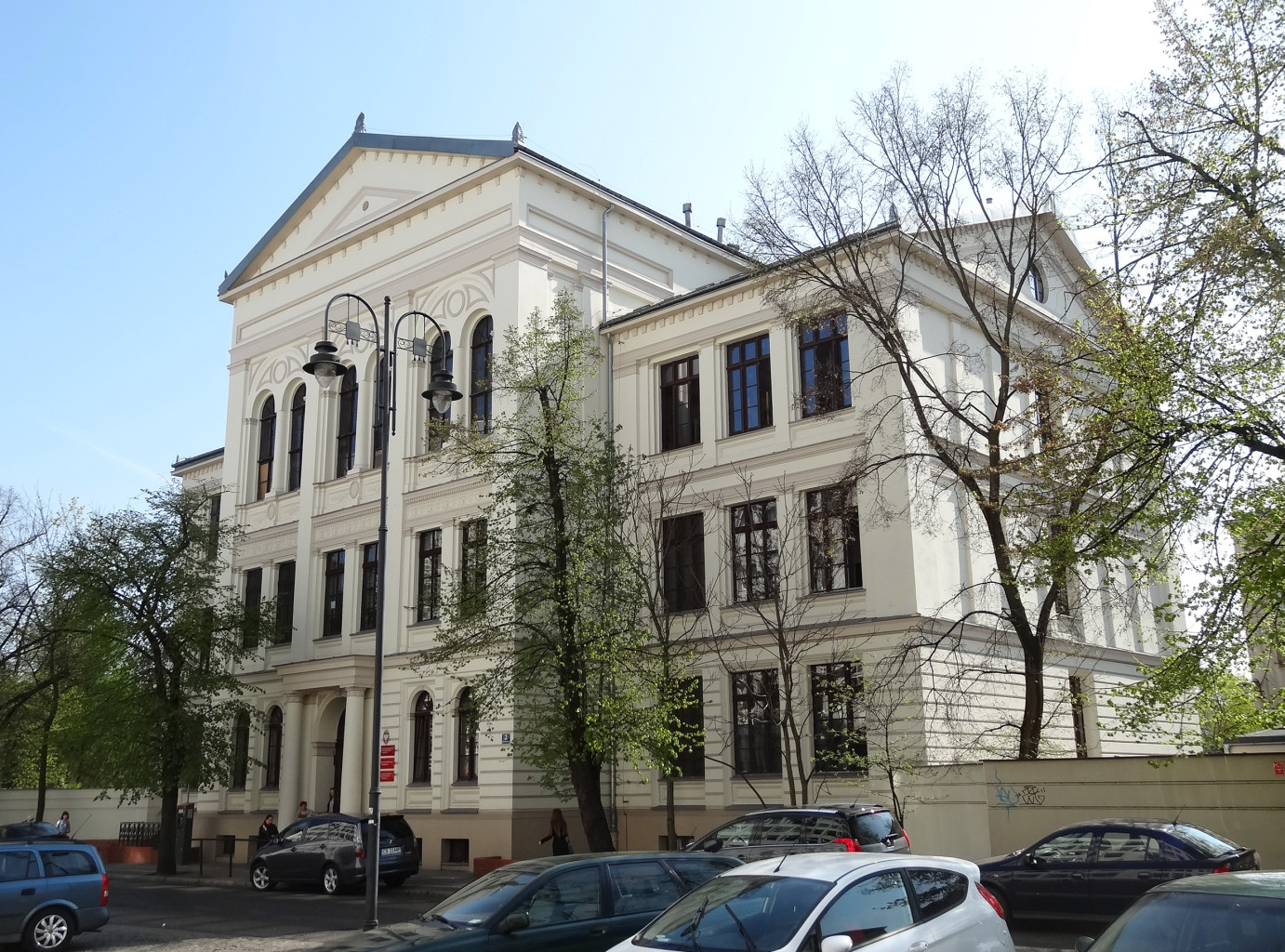
Bydgoszcz School of Fine Arts, by Heinrich Grüder

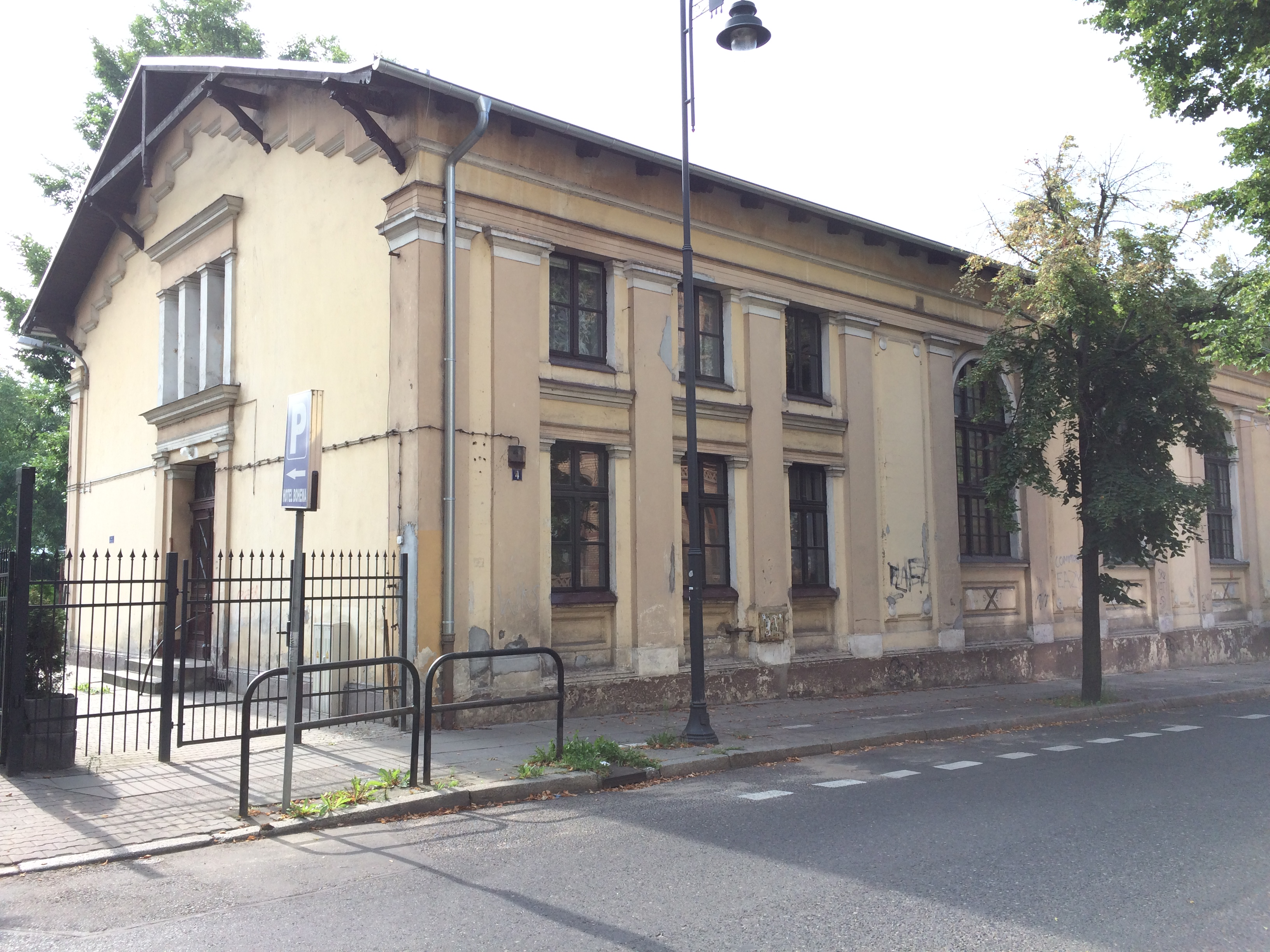
Gymnasium at Nr.4, by Heinrich Grüder

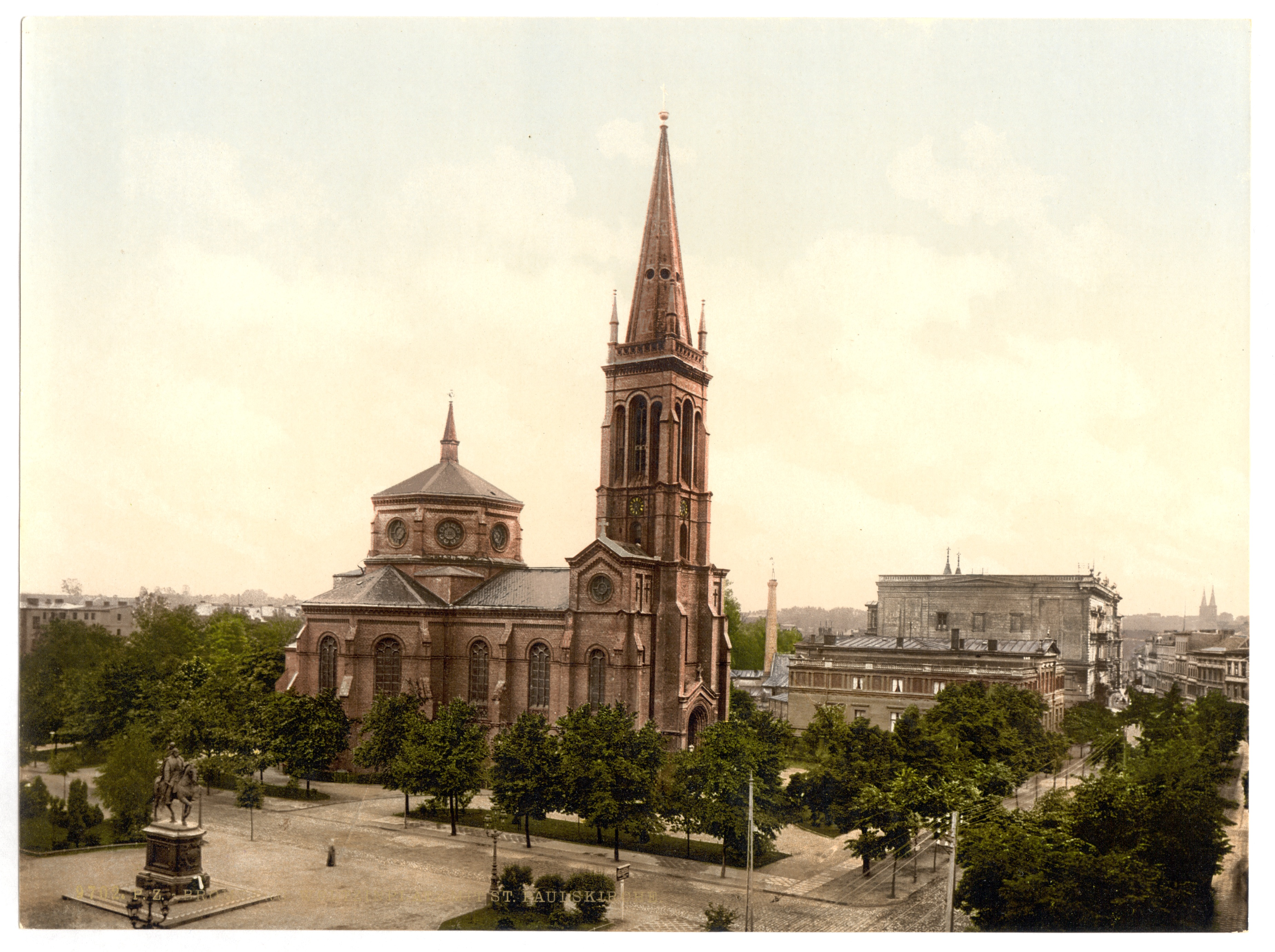
The Evangelical church, ca 1895

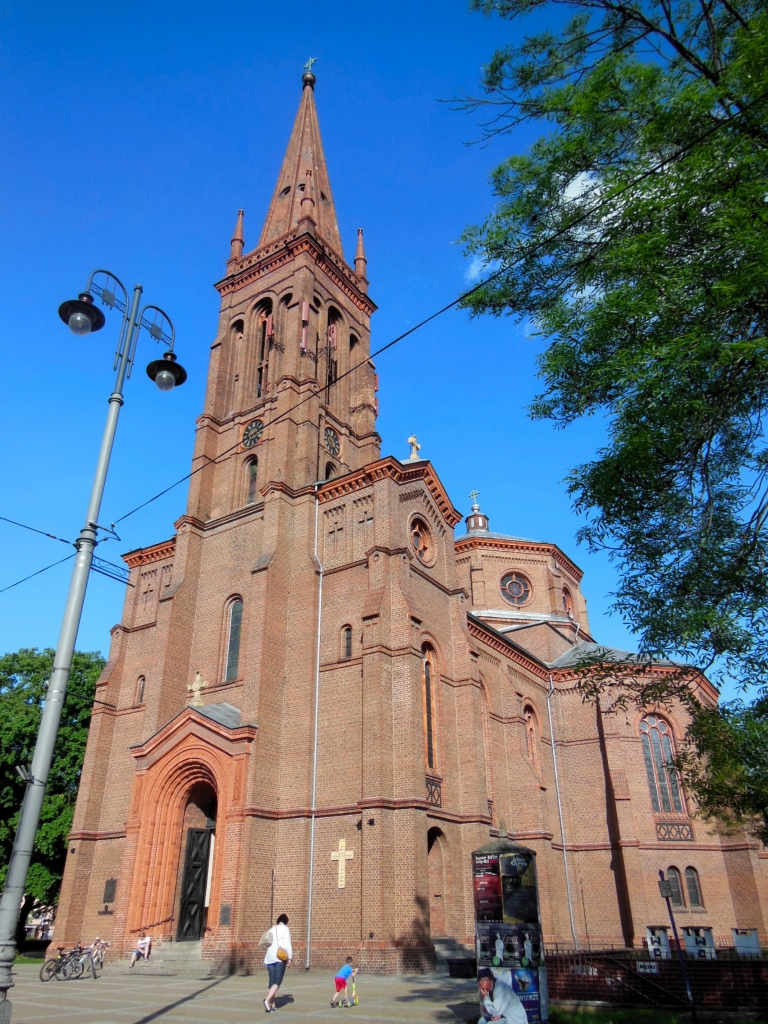
Today's St Peter's and St Paul's Church

==== Wilhelm Lincke (1878–1885) ====
Wilhelm Lincke was born in 1846, in Magdeburg. He graduated from city high school in 1863. Then, for two years, he attended the Royal School of Fine Arts and the Institute of Crafts for the Study of Architecture in Magdeburg. Later he moved to Berlin: there he studied at the Royal Academy of Construction from 1865 to 1867. Afterwards, he was employed till 1873 on railways projects, building railway stations (Gotha, Erfurt, Weimar, Naumburg, Weißenfels) and other technical facilities. In 1870, he took part in Franco-Prussian War. Later, he is found to work in Zgorzelec Municipal Construction Office, then in Wiesbaden (1876). In January 1878, he accepted the position of city construction counselor in Bromberg where he stayed until his death on November 28, 1885, aged 39.

As a construction adviser, he approved a number of private building projects. He had a significant influence on the projects realized at that time, generally referring to Neoclassicism and Neo-renaissance. He is mainly remembered for his work on the reconstruction of the former Jesuit College building, so as to fit the city authorities; he worked on it in collaboration with Albert Rose and Heinrich Mautz. In addition, he was the author of other projects funded from municipal budget:

- the adaptation and expansion in 1878, of the former monastery of the Poor Clares to house a municipal hospital (today Building of the District Museum in Bydgoszcz at 4 Gdańska Street). He designed the façade with Neo-renaissance and Neo-Manerism forms;
- the design of the building of the Municipal School for Girls (German: Höhere Mädchenschule) in 1884, at 5 Konarskiego street (today building of the Catering School of Bydgoszcz);
- the design of the second city hospital (German: Diakonissenanstalt), at Seminaryjna street (1884–1885), nowadays the Center of Pulmonology of Bydgoszcz.
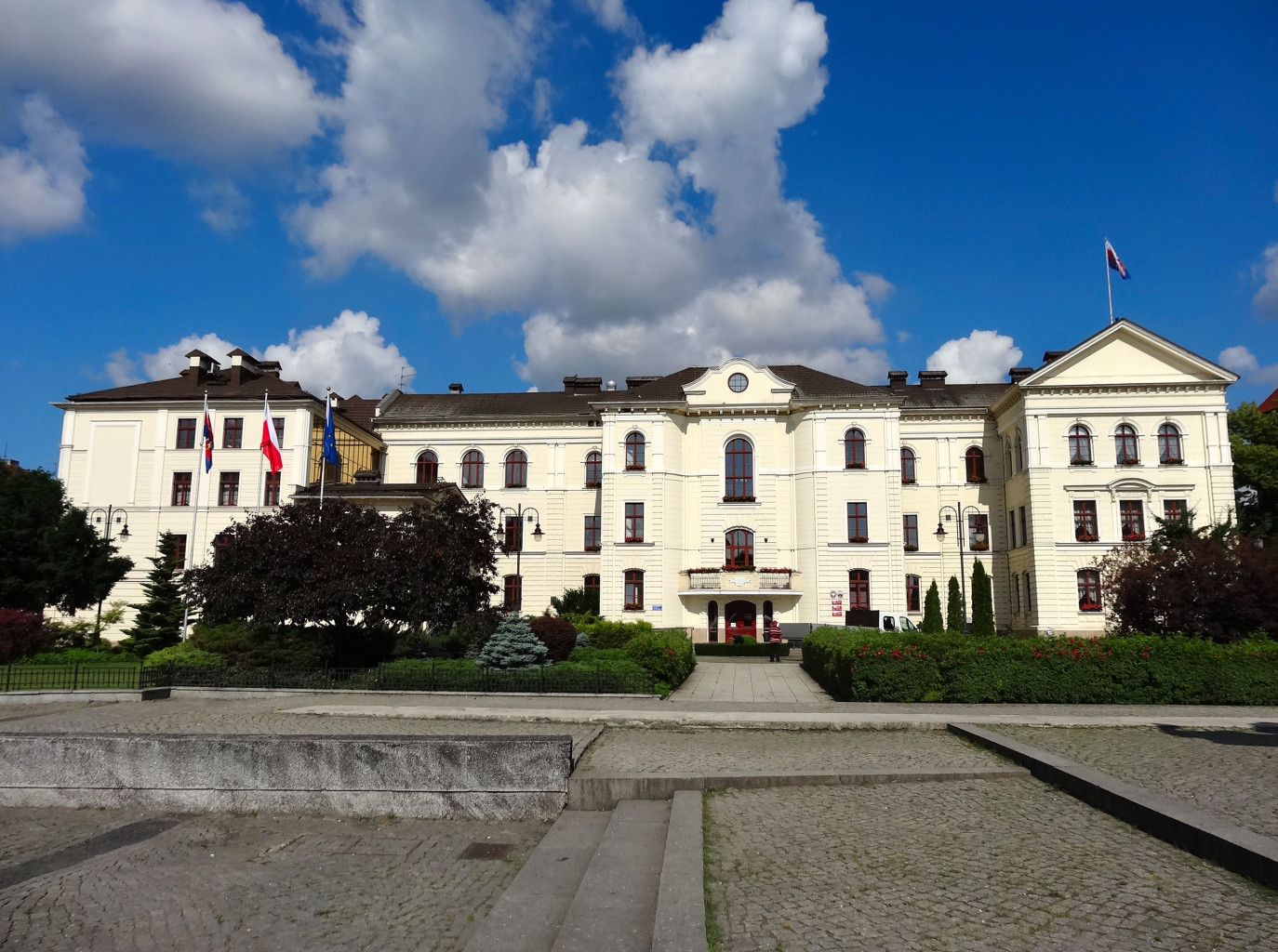
Bydgoszcz city hall, former Jesuit College

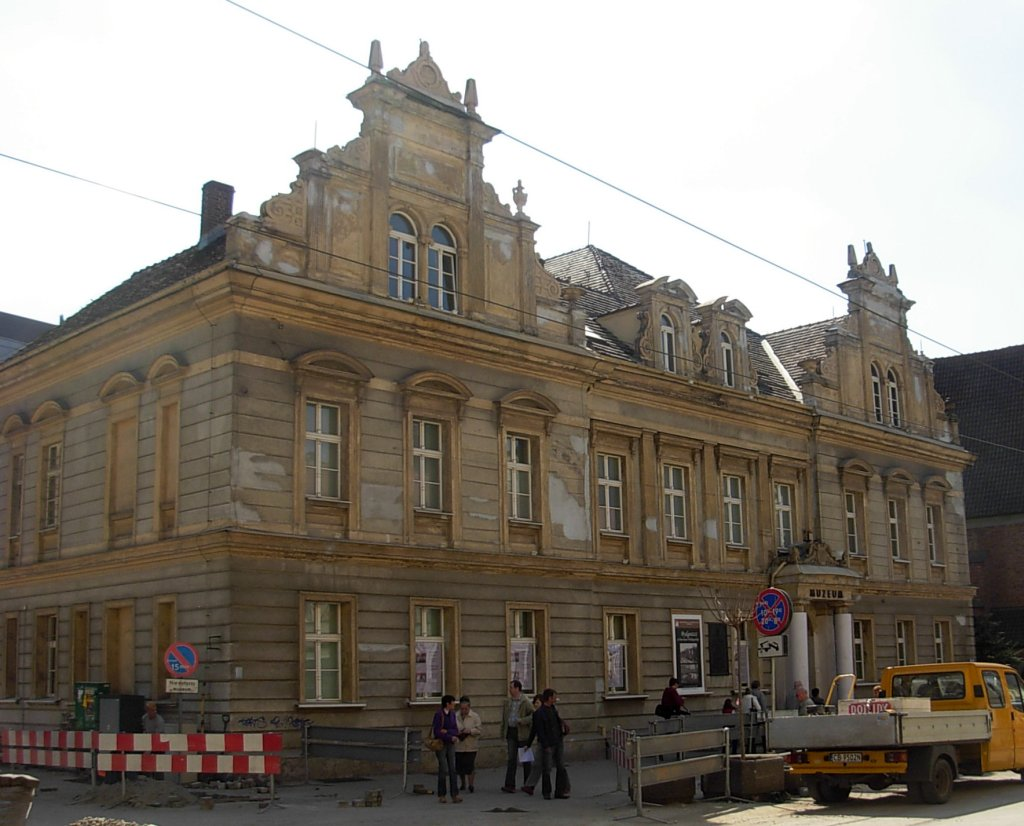
Seat of the District Museum in Bydgoszcz, former monastery of the Poor Clares

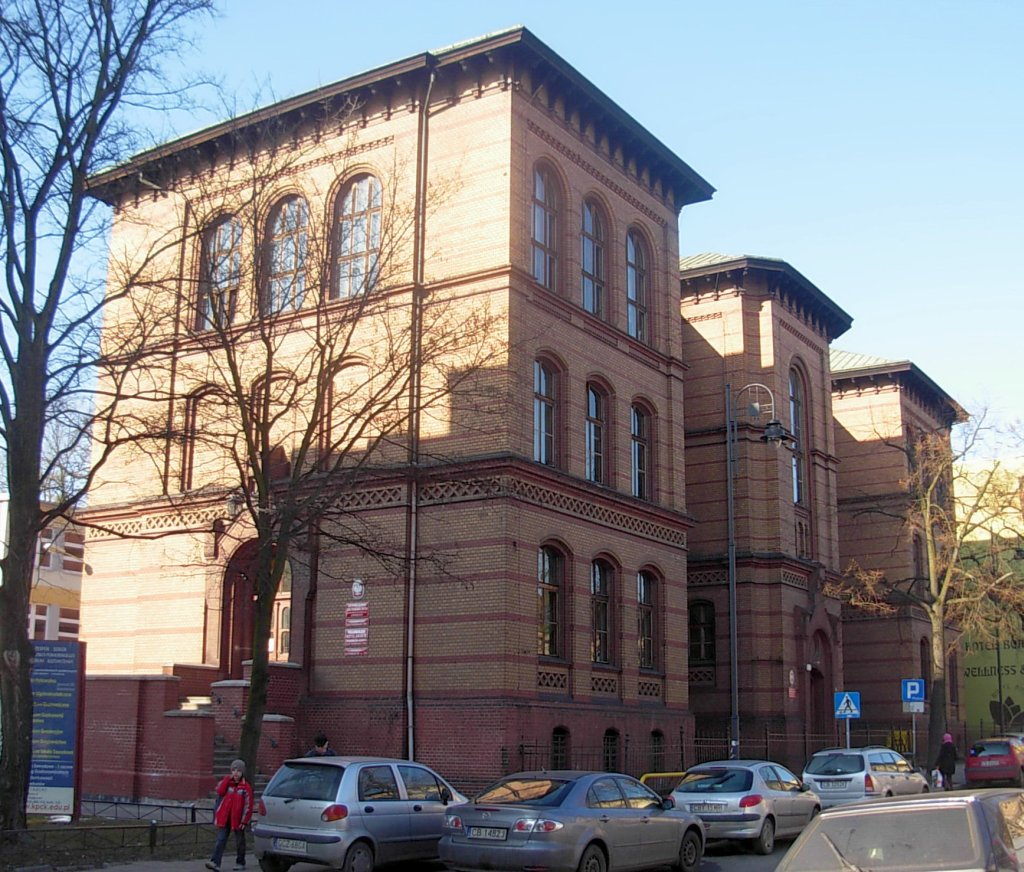
Bydgoszcz Catering School building, former Prussian Municipal School for Girls

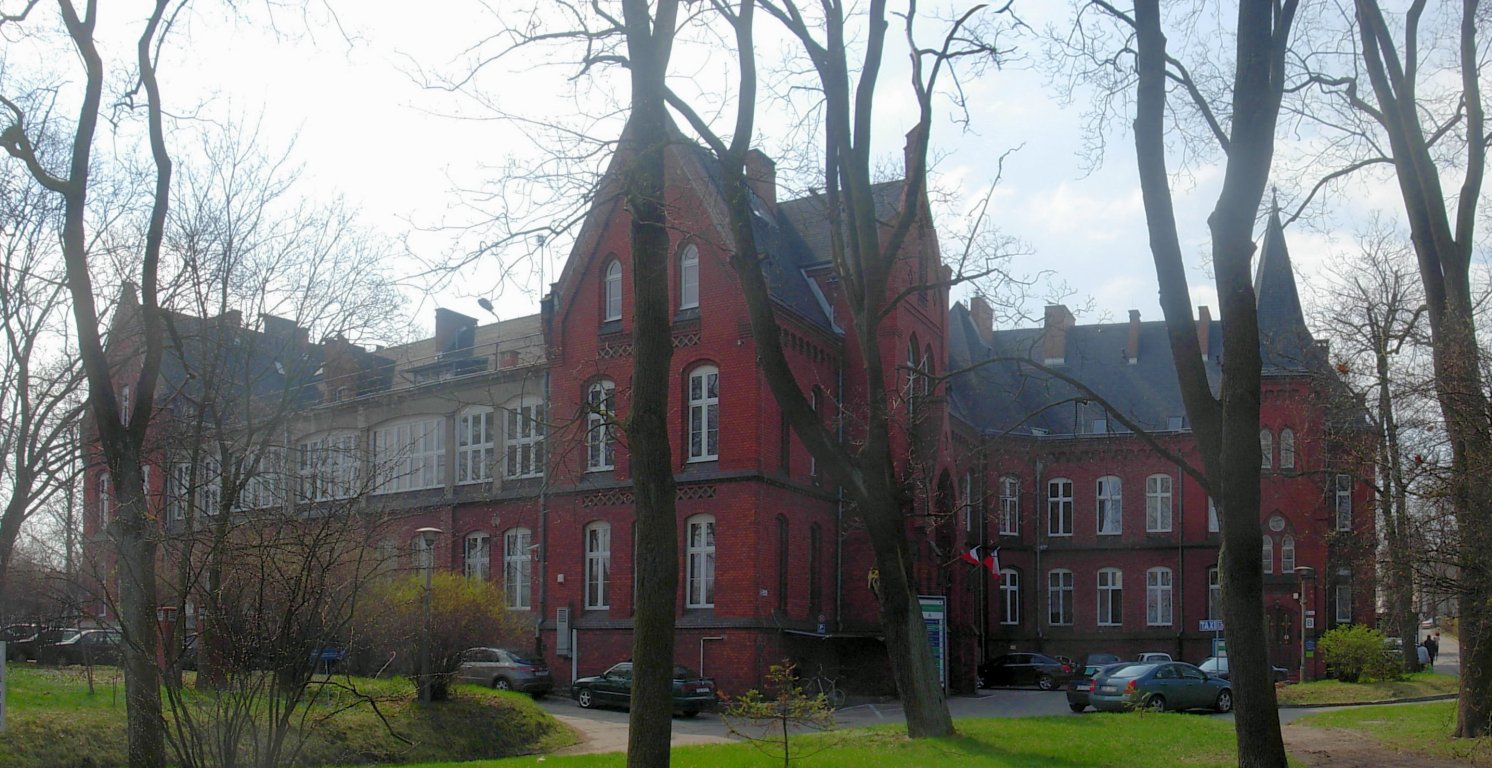
Center of Pulmonology in Bydgoszcz, former Prussian city hospital

==== Carl Meyer (1886–1912) ====
Carl Meyer was born on December 17, 1855, in the family of the manufacturer GL Meyer in Estorf in Nienburg district, Lower Saxony province. After an education in a private school in neighboring Husum, he attended the Royal High School of Verden an der Aller. On October 1, 1875, he was employed in the technical office of the Royal Railway Commission in Hanover, and in 1876, he began studies at the Polytechnic University of Hanover, from where he graduated cum laude in 1880. He was a student of German architects Conrad Wilhelm Hase, A. Schröder and W. Schuch. In 1881, he started a two-year practice in public service in Silesia, in the area of Jelenia Góra, as a construction manager.

At the death of Wilhelm Lincke, Bromberg authorities selected Carl Meyer as his successor on December 15, 1885. He took up the function of city building councilor on January 5, 1886. On November 30, 1891, he entered Janus Masonic lodge, and served as its master from 1907 to 1912. For several years he lived at 60 Gdańska street, downtown Bydgoszcz. At the end of his first contract period, City Council re-elected him on July 14, 1898, for a second term and then on July 14, 1910, for another one. However, Carl Meyer fell ill in the autumn 1911 and had to retire on April 1, 1912. He then left Bydgoszcz for Berlin in 1919 and later returned to his homeland and settled in Hanover. His death date (ca. 1920s) has not been determined precisely. In recognition for his merits, he was twice honored with Prussian state decorations: the Order of the Red Eagle - 4th class (1905), and the Royal Order of the Crown - 3rd class after his retirement in May 1913.

Carl Meyer, during his 26-year long activity as city advisor, had a huge impact on Bydgoszcz architecture and layout, during its expansion bloom (end of 19th – beginning of 20th century). He belonged to the German Union of Architects and Engineers and traveled a lot, not only within the German Empire, but also to Italy and France to learn about new trends in architecture and urban planning. His closest subordinates and associates included people who are authors of many edifices in downtown Bydgoszcz, among others:

- Wilhelm Stagge (associate from 1881 to 1919), his deputy;
- Rudolf Berndt (ass. 1888–1890), a master carpenter;
- Paul Bresgott (from 1891 on), an architect and master mason;
- Karl Bergner (ass. from 1892 on), an architect, who ran a private architectural office, one of the most popular designers in the city, until 1919 (see below);
- Anton Kandler, a municipal construction manager (from 1897 on);
- Richard Köppen, an architect, who worked on city hospital (German: Diakonissenanstalt) extension project in 1908;
- Theodor Patzwald, an architect, building designer of the city fire station in 1909;
- Otto Brech, an architect, who worked on two main projects, the School of Mechanical Engineering and the Bürgerschule building (today High School Nr.6);
- Paul Sellner, an architect who designed many tenements in Gdańska Street (see below).

Carl Meyer's style fluctuates around forms borrowed from medieval architecture like Gothic architecture. As a man influenced by Hanover school of architecture, he designed buildings set in the Historicism mainstream, nuanced with Neo-gothic and Neo-romanesque elements.

===== Carl Meyer's preserved accomplishments in Bydgoszcz =====
Year	Edifice	Remarks	Picture
1887–1888	Building at 20 Świętojańska street	Initially housing Schools for boys and girls (German: Volkschulen), today one of the site of the Collegium Medicum Faculty in Bydgoszcz.	
1890–1892	City Slaughterhouse	Slaughterhouse complex (German: Schlachtund Viehhof), at 43/47 Jagiellońska street. Today, preserved buildings have been incorporated into the shopping center complex Focus Mall.	
1890–1892	Building at 8 Kościelecki Square	Originally schools for boys and girls (German: Volkschulen). Currently the Department of Journalism and Social Communication of UKW.	
1891–1892	Carl Meyer tenement	Architect house at 60 Gdańska Street. Dutch Mannerism style frontage. Elevation boasts allegory sculptures of Architecture and Construction and MC initials of the landlord.	
1896–1898	Building at 5 Sowińskiego street	Originally schools for boys and girls (German: Volkschulen). Currently Youth Hotel for Schools (Polish: Szkolne Schronisko Młodzieżowe).	
1897–1898	Tenement at 6 Cieszkowskiego street	One of the oldest building in the street, with eclectic style.	
1899–1900	Bydgoszcz water tower	Disused facility at Filarecka street.	
1899–1900	Las Gdański water supply station	Located at 242 Gdańska Street, initial project by Berlin architect Franz Marshall. Pumping station still operates today.	
1900–1902	Tenement at 20 Kordeckiego street	Originally schools for boys and girls (German: Volkschulen), currently a site of the University of Technology and Life Sciences in Bydgoszcz.	

Year	Edifice	Remarks	Picture
1904–1905	Gasworks building	Located at 42 Jagiellońska street, only the former administrative house is preserved (today the seat of the Pomeranian Gas Company, Branch Gas Plant of Bydgoszcz).	
1905–1906	Municipal Market Hall	Initially the Prussian fish and meat market (German: Fleisch- und Fischmarkthalle), it is situated at 4 Podwale Street.	
1906	House at 5 20 January 1920 street	Own ville of Carl Meyer, with a facade style referring to eclecticism and Art Nouveau.	
1906–1907	Building at 5 Traugutta street	Initially the municipal orphanage established by Heinrich Dietz. Today the seat of institutions dealing with care and teaching.	
1902, 1908–1909	Kuyawsko-Pomorskie Center of Pulmonology	Initially the second city hospital, it was extended by architect Richard Köppen.	
1908–1909	Kuyawsko-Pomorskie Cultural Center	Initially an infant dispensary. Situated at 6 Kościelecki Square	
1910–1911	Mechanical School Nr.1	Originally the School of Crafts and Artistic Industry (German: Handwerker- und Kunstgewerbeschule), at 37 Świętej Trojcy street, the project was prepared by architect Otto Brech.	
1911–1912	Fire brigade building	Located at 16/18 Pomorska Street, the project was developed in 1909 by Theodor Patzwald, under the supervision of Meyer.	
1910–1912	High School Nr.6	Originally a citizens' school for Boys (German: Burgerschule), at 4 Staszica Street, the design was initiated by architect Otto Brech.	

==== Heinrich Rudolf Metzger (1912–1920) ====
Born in Mainz in 1861, Heinrich Metzger graduated from Baukademie in Berlin. He traveled in Prussia for work: in Szczecin in 1885, as an assistant engineer in the municipal waterworks, in Cologne in 1889, as an engineer in the Canal Construction Inspection, then in Toruń in 1891, as city's chief engineer.

In 1894 he took up the responsibility of gasworks director in Bydgoszcz and on October 1, 1894, he took the position of head of the municipal gas plant. While working in Bydgoszcz, he regularly provided his expertise for the construction and modernization of water supply and sewage systems in other cities such as Leszno, Chełmno, Kętrzyn or Kwidzyn. In 1901, he was elected municipal councilor and on July 12, 1912, he was appointed city construction adviser, taking over Carl Meyer. In particular, during his appointment, he developed the project of Sielanka district (Idyll, in Polish) in the early 1910s.

He retired on December 15, 1919, and thanks to his highly appreciated role, Heinrich took part on January 20, 1920, on behalf of the German party, to the official ceremony where Bydgoszcz re-integrated the motherland: he was one of the signatories to the commemorative protocol. He then moved to Berlin (Charlottenburg), where he died on 22 April 1929.

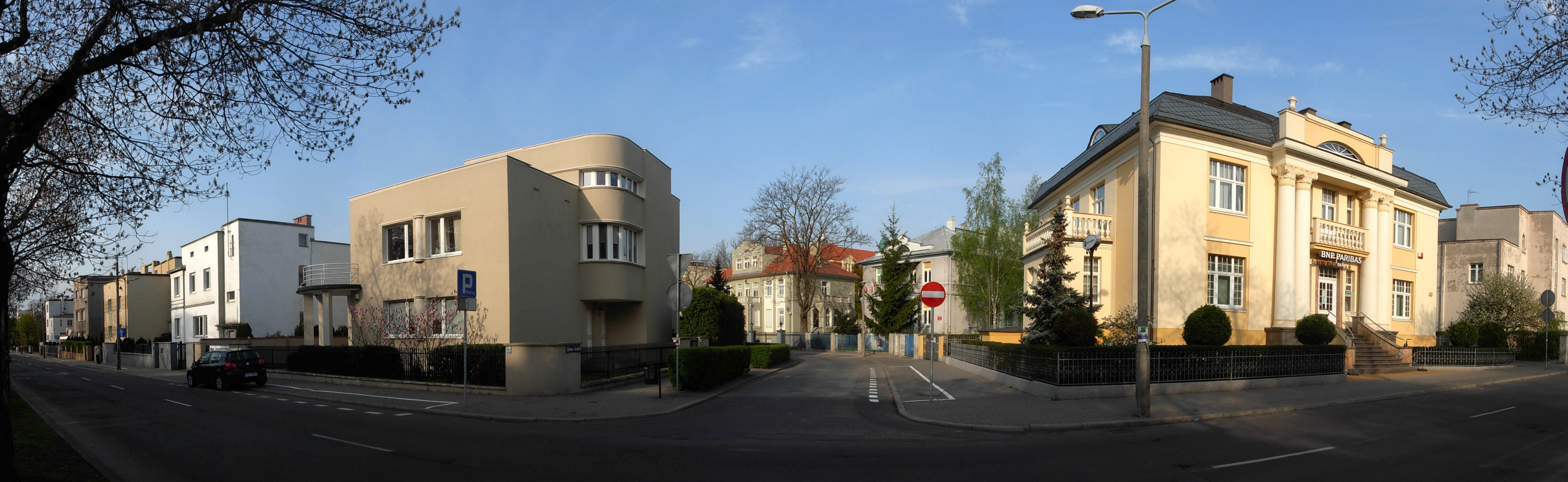
View of houses in Sielanka district

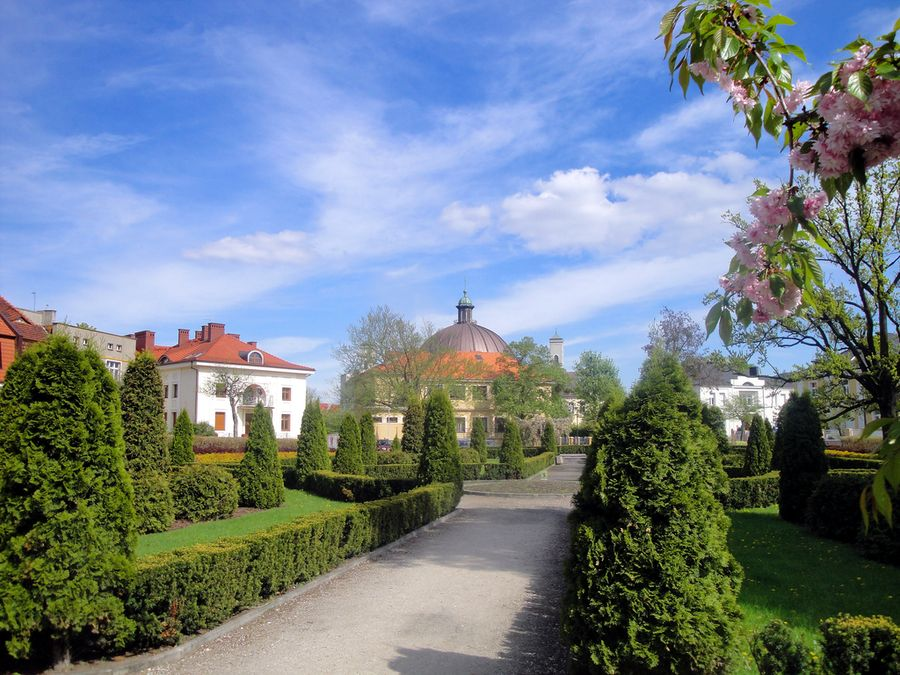
View of Sielanka area, with the Basilica's dome in the backdrop

=== Independent architects ===
Apart from citie's official advisors, the Prussian construction community in Bromberg teamed with independent private architects and builders. Those men, gathering bricklayer, mason and carpentry masters, have been involved in the design and the construction of many a building in downtown Bydgoszcz.

==== Carl Stampehl ====
Little is known about Carl Stampehl. He was an active architect in the 1870s and 1880s, especially while re-designing several houses along Długa street in Bydgoszcz old town district.

===== Carl Stampehl's preserved accomplishments in Bydgoszcz =====
Year	Edifice	Remarks	Picture
ca. 1875	Tenement at 11 Welniany rynek	A cartouche above a first floor window still bears the "A" initial from the first landlord, baker Heinrich Affeldt.	
1876	Tenement at 24 Focha street	Johann Kretschmer, a wood merchand, was the landlord of both buildings at then Wilhelmstraße 7A (Nr.24) and Wilhelmstraße 7 (Nr.26)	
1876	Tenement at 26 Focha street	Johann Kretschmer, a wood merchand, was the landlord of both buildings at then Wilhelmstraße 7A (Nr.24) and Wilhelmstraße 7 (Nr.26)	
1877–1878	House at 32 Długa street	House from 1792, rebuilt in 1878. This reconstruction has been commissioned by Arnold Aronsohn, a merchant.	
1877–1878	House at 35 Długa street	House from 1783, rebuilt in 1878. Facade has been refurbished in 2016–2017.	
1878	House at 34 Długa street	House from 1860, rebuilt in 1878. It is today the Provincial Department of Polish Economic Society in Bydgoszcz.	
1879	House at 46 Długa street	House from the last quarter of the 18th century, rebuilt in 1879. The edifice is waiting a heavy overhaul.	

Year	Edifice	Remarks	Picture
1879	House at 12 Długa street	House from 1866, rebuilt in 1879, registered on Kuyavian-Pomeranian Voivodeship heritage list. During the Greater Poland uprising (1918–1919), thanks to landlord Stanislaw Stryszyk, premises functioned as an infirmary for wounded insurgents, with the heroic help of Dr. Jan Biziel.	
1882–1884	Emil Bernhardt tenement	Large tenement at 16 Gdańska street, first owned by Emil Bernhardt, who commissioned abutting Hotel "Pod Orlem". Registered on Kuyavian-Pomeranian Voivodeship heritage list.	
1883	Tenement at 22 Gdanska street	The edifice has been built in 1850, then re-designed by C. Stampehl in 1883, and renovated by Rudolf Kern in 1910–1911. Registered on Kuyavian-Pomeranian Voivodeship heritage list.	
1885	House at 24 Długa street	House from the 1770s, rebuilt in 1885. Registered on Kuyavian-Pomeranian Voivodeship heritage list.	
1893	Villa Carl Blumwe	The house at Nakielska street 53 was erected in the 1850s. Wilhelm, son of Carl Blumwe, commissioned Carl Stampehl for the reconstruction and extension of the building.	
1893–1894	Tenement at 3 Dworcowa Street	Eduard Merres, an instrument craftsman for surgery, nursery and optics, was the first owner of the current house.	

==== Carl Rose ====
Carl Emil Heinrich Rose was born on December 11, 1864, in Barth near Stralsund. He studied in a realschule in Barth and then in Stralsund.

In 1882, he began his practical apprenticeship in Bromberg in the company run by his uncle, mason master Albert Rose, established in 1866. He attended a technical school in Buxtehude, where he graduated and passed the master builder 's exam (German: Baugewerksmeister). After a 4-semester at the Technische Hochschule in Charlottenburg (now Technische Universität Berlin), he traveled to gain experience to Denmark, Sweden and Norway. At the beginning of September 1890, he returned to Bydgoszcz to take over his uncle's firm. He was professionally active in the city until 1920.

He was a member of the Silesian-Poznan Building Trade Association (German: Schlesisch-Posenschen Baugewerks Berufsgenossenschaft) and from June 7, 1898, he belonged to the Janus Masonic lodge in Bydgoszcz.

===== Carl Rose's preserved accomplishments in Bydgoszcz =====
Year	Edifice	Remarks	Picture
1893	Tenement at 135 Gdańska Street	First owner was a cabdriver, Wincent Swirski. Above the main entrance is placed a stylized head of a woman. A major overhaul happened in 2000.	
1893	House at 6 Jezuicka Street	Carl Rose rebuilt a tenement erected there in the 1860s.	
1894	Pharmacy Pod Lwem (English: Under the Lion)	Carl Rose followed the design realized by Józef Święcicki and Karl Bergner	
1903–1904	Carl Rose Tenement	Located at 51 Gdańska Street, it was the personal house of the architect.	
1905	Building at 18 Warmińskiego street	Facades display Art Nouveau style. Today the seat of the city Tax office.	
1905	Church of Divine Mercy	Located at 68 Nakielska street. Registered on the Kuyavian-Pomeranian heritage list, the temple was first an evangelical church.	

==== Józef Święcicki ====
Józef Święcicki (1859 in Bromberg, 1913 in Berlin), has been the most successful and influential architect, builder and construction designer in Bydgoszcz at the end of the 19th century. All his life and his work are related to the city.

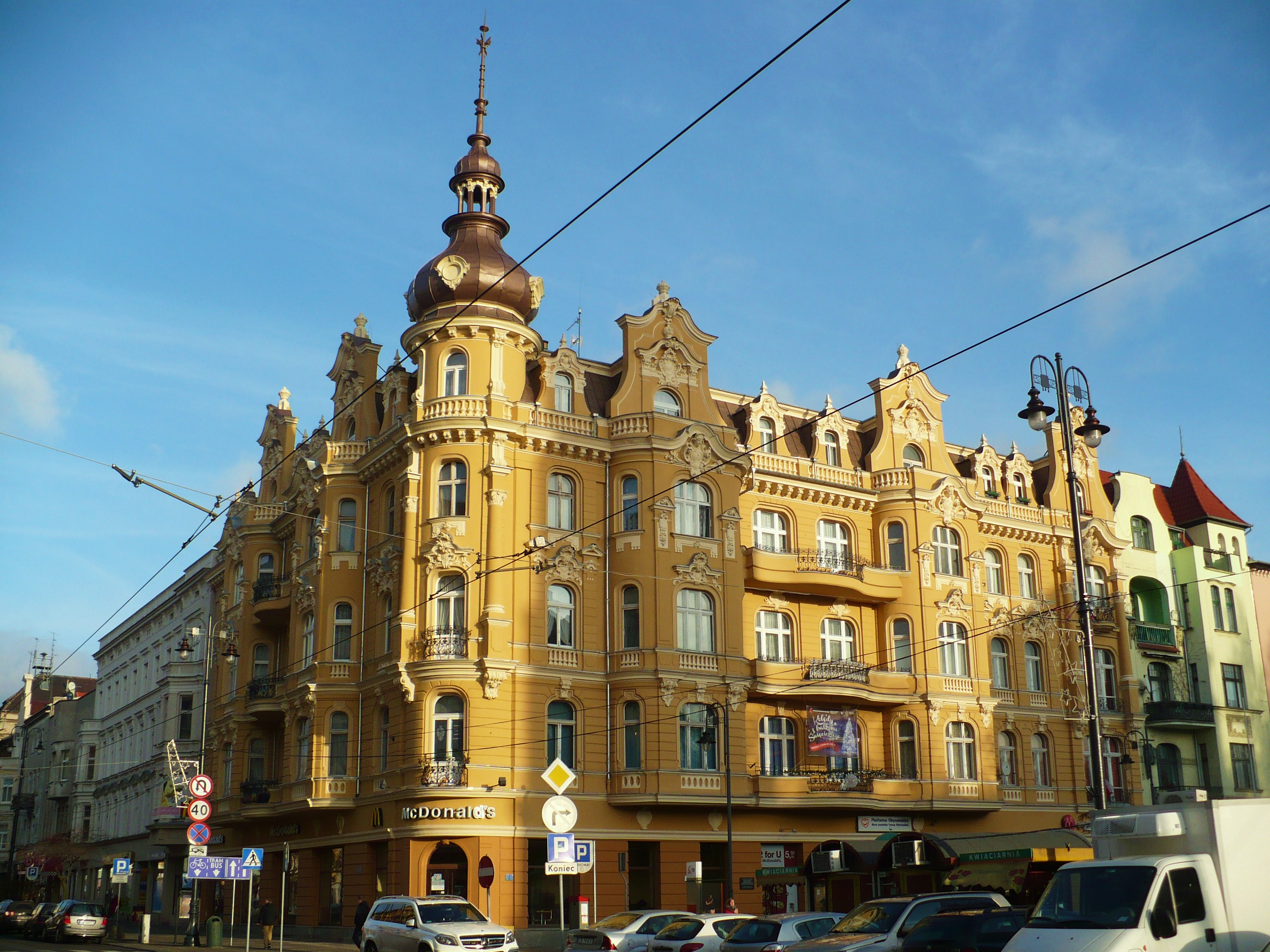
Tenement at 1 Plac Wolności

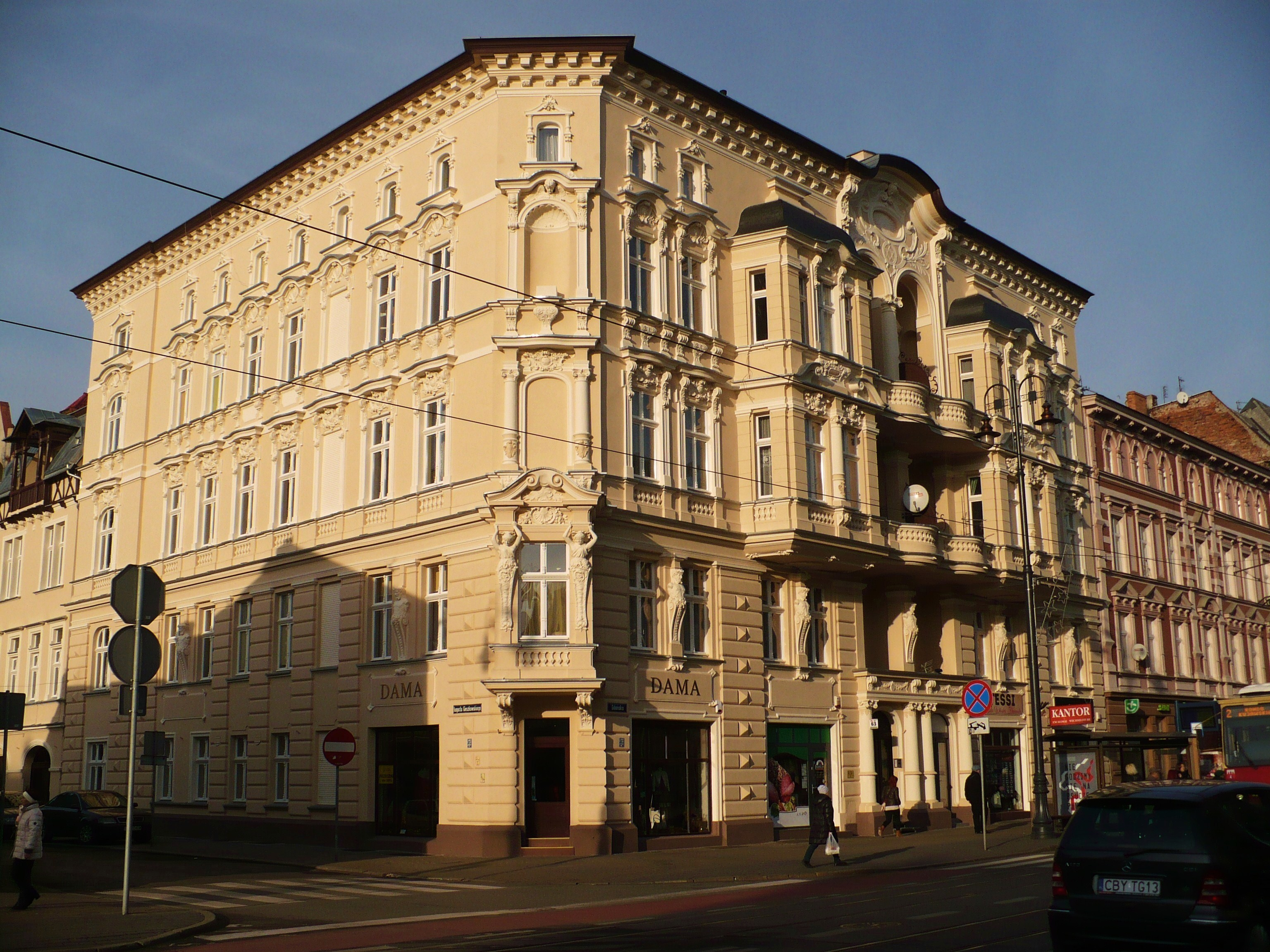
Józef Święcicki tenement

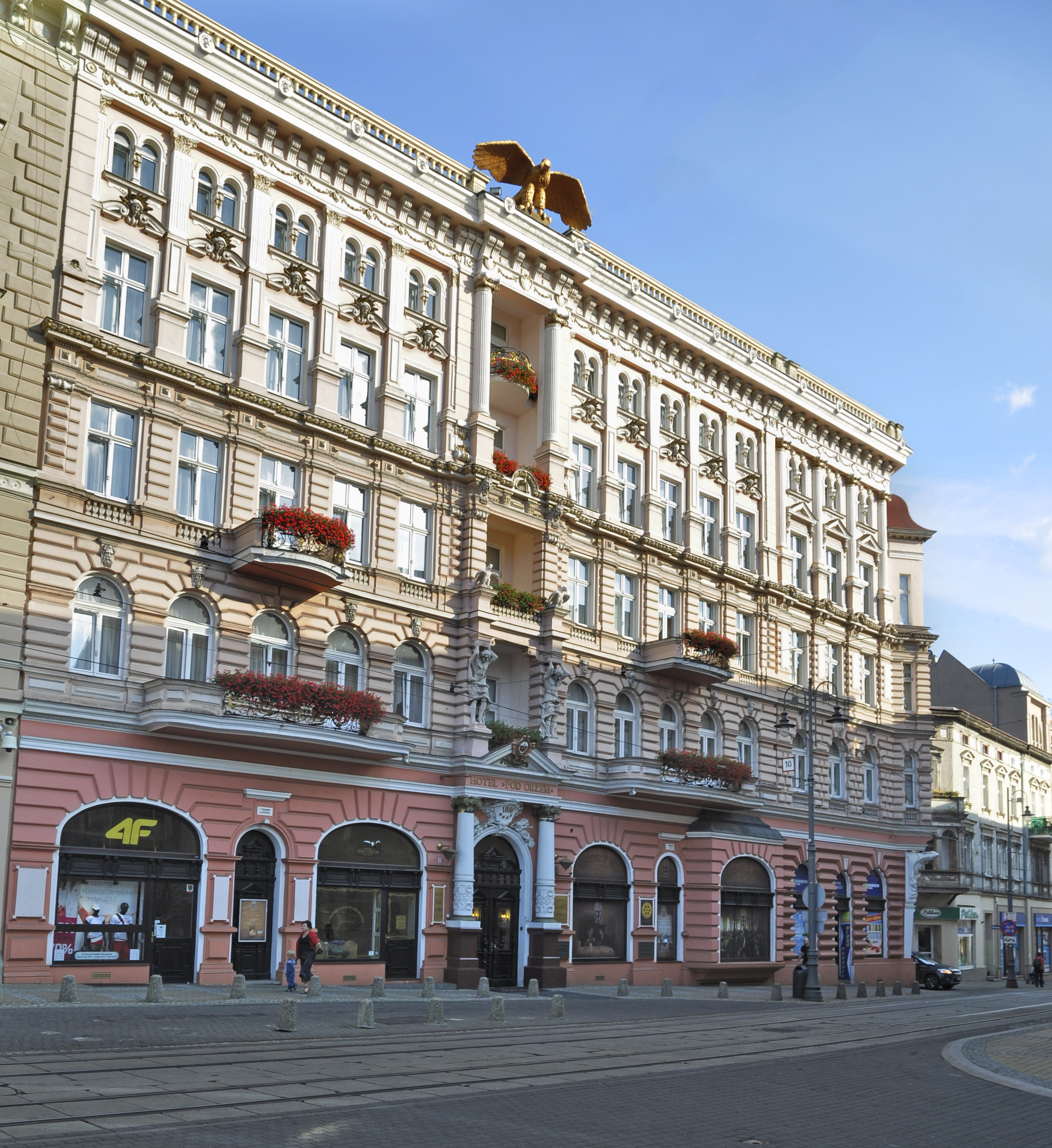
Hotel "Pod Orlem"

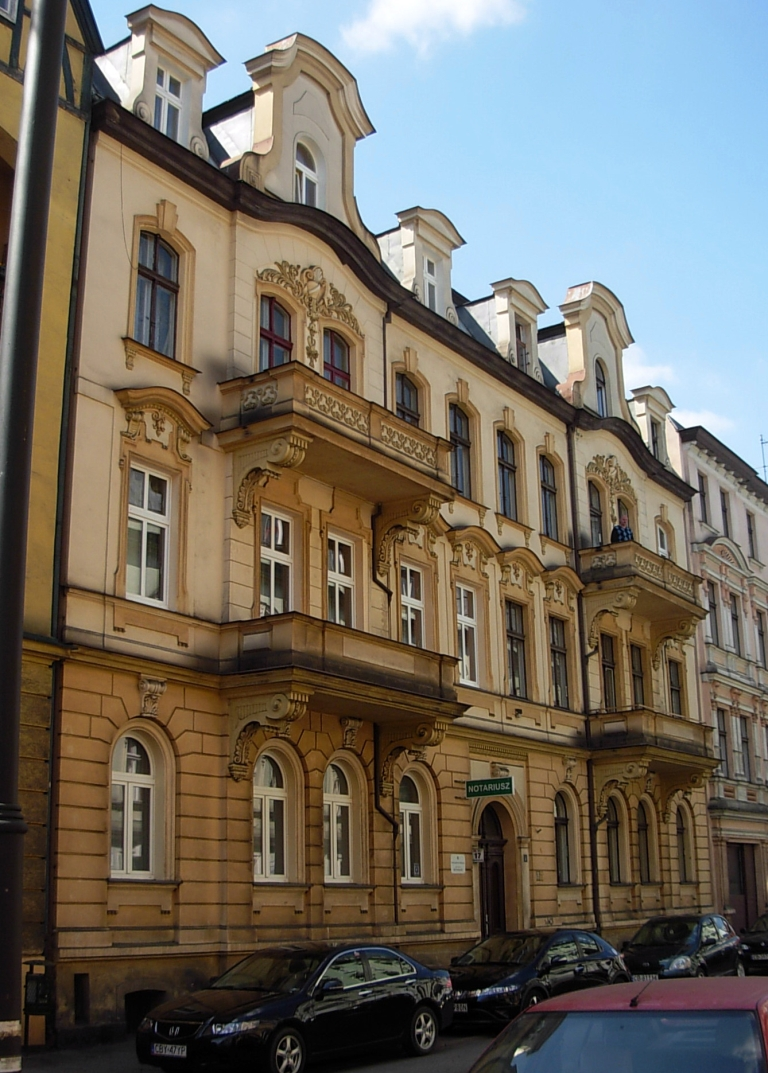
Tenement at 17 Cieszkowskiego Street

==== Karl Bergner ====
Karl Bergner was born on March 9, 1864. He has been active in Bromberg as an architect from the 1880s to the First World War. He was one of the most prolific architects of his time in the city. His designs usually included Eclecticism style with Neo-Renaissance and Neo-baroque decoration stuccoes.

He ran a company and a technical work office. He also held the position of Municipal Construction Assistant. Having first settled in 1888 at 7 Poznański Square, he set up a design studio there in 1892. He then regularly moved to the houses he designed: Hetmańska Street (1895), Gdańska Street (1896), Śniadecki Street (1897). Like other architects in the city at the eve of the 20th century, Karl Bergner dealt with the design and construction of tenement houses sold at Cieszkowskiego Street.

From October 7, 1899, he became a member of the Janus Masonic lodge in Bydgoszcz.

===== Karl Bergner's preserved accomplishments in Bydgoszcz =====
Year	Edifice	Remarks	Picture
1870s	Tenement at 100 Dworcowa Street	The house is located opposite the one at Nr.77.	
1876	Albin Cohnfeld tenement	Located at 77 Dworcowa Street, it is one of the earliest realizations of Karl Bergner in Bydgoszcz.	
1884	Tenement at 2 Dworcowa Street	One of the first realizations of Karl Bergner in Bydgoszcz.	
1892–1893	August Freitwald tenement	Located at 12 Śniadecki Street, its first landlord was August Freitwald, a master shoemaker.	
1893–1896	Tenements at 13,15,17 Piastowski Square	These buildings were part of common project by different commissioners.	
1893–1896	Tenement at 68 Dworcowa Street	The initial owner was Karl Schultz, a metal craftsman.	
1893–1905	Tenement at 3 Bernardyńska Street		
1894	Pharmacy Pod Lwem (Under the lion)	Located at 37 Grunwaldzka street in Bydgoszcz	
1895–1896	Albert Jahnte tenement	Located at 6 Śniadecki Street, its first landlord was a merchand, Albert Jahnte.	
1895–1896	Tenement at 20 Śniadecki Street	First owner was August Freitwald, also landlord at Nr.12.	
1895–1897	Karl Bergner tenement	Registered on Kuyavian-Pomeranian Voivodeship heritage list, it has been one of Bergner's own house.	
1896	Tenement at 2 Libelta street	First landlord was Anton Czarnecki, a rentier and merchant, who moved there in 1898 and stayed till the early 1920s.	

Year	Edifice	Remarks	Picture
1897	Bydgoszcz Chamber theatre at 14/16 Grodzka Street	Registered on Kuyavian-Pomeranian Voivodeship heritage list. First theatre had been built in 1875–1876.	
1898–1899	Villa Carl Grosse	Registered on Kuyavian-Pomeranian Voivodeship heritage list. Located at 84 Gdańska Street, the house had been commissioned by Carl Gross, a cork factory manager who kept the seat here of his firm.	
1899	House at 24 Cieszkowskiego Street	Initial project has been carried out by Fritz Weidner. Registered on Kuyavian-Pomeranian Voivodeship heritage list.	
1899	Wilhelm Brzęczkowski's house	Located at 14 Cieszkowskiego Street, built for a tailor, Wilhelm Brzęczkowsk. Registered on Kuyavian-Pomeranian Voivodeship heritage list.	
1899–1901	Ancient shelter for blinds	Located at 9 Kołłątaja street, the building is registered on Kuyavian-Pomeranian Voivodeship heritage list; it was initially conceived as a refuge for blind children (German: Blindenheim).	
1901–1902	Max Zweininger Building	Located at 2 Focha street, Max Zweininger was the owner of a famous hat manufactory. In 1940, a ground floor arcade has been added, designed by Polish architect Jan Kossowski.	
1901–1902	Tenement at 4 Focha street	The elevation architectural details echo the abutting building at 2.	
1900–1902	Tenement at 7 Cieszkowskiego Street	Registered on Kuyavian-Pomeranian Voivodeship heritage list.	
1900–1902	Tenement at 9 Cieszkowskiego Street	Registered on Kuyavian-Pomeranian Voivodeship heritage list, it has been commissioned by a merchant, Ephreim Moritz.	
1900–1902	Tenements at 16,18,20 Cieszkowskiego Street	Registered on Kuyavian-Pomeranian Voivodeship heritage list. The initiator of the project was Vincent Krause, who sold the plot to the architect Karl Bergner.	

==== Fritz Weidner ====
Fritz Weidner (1863 in Nowe Drezdenko, 1950 in Potsdam) was an architect who worked during most of his life in Bromberg. Like his colleague Józef Święcicki his numerous realizations had a profound influence on downtown Bydgoszcz urban landscape.

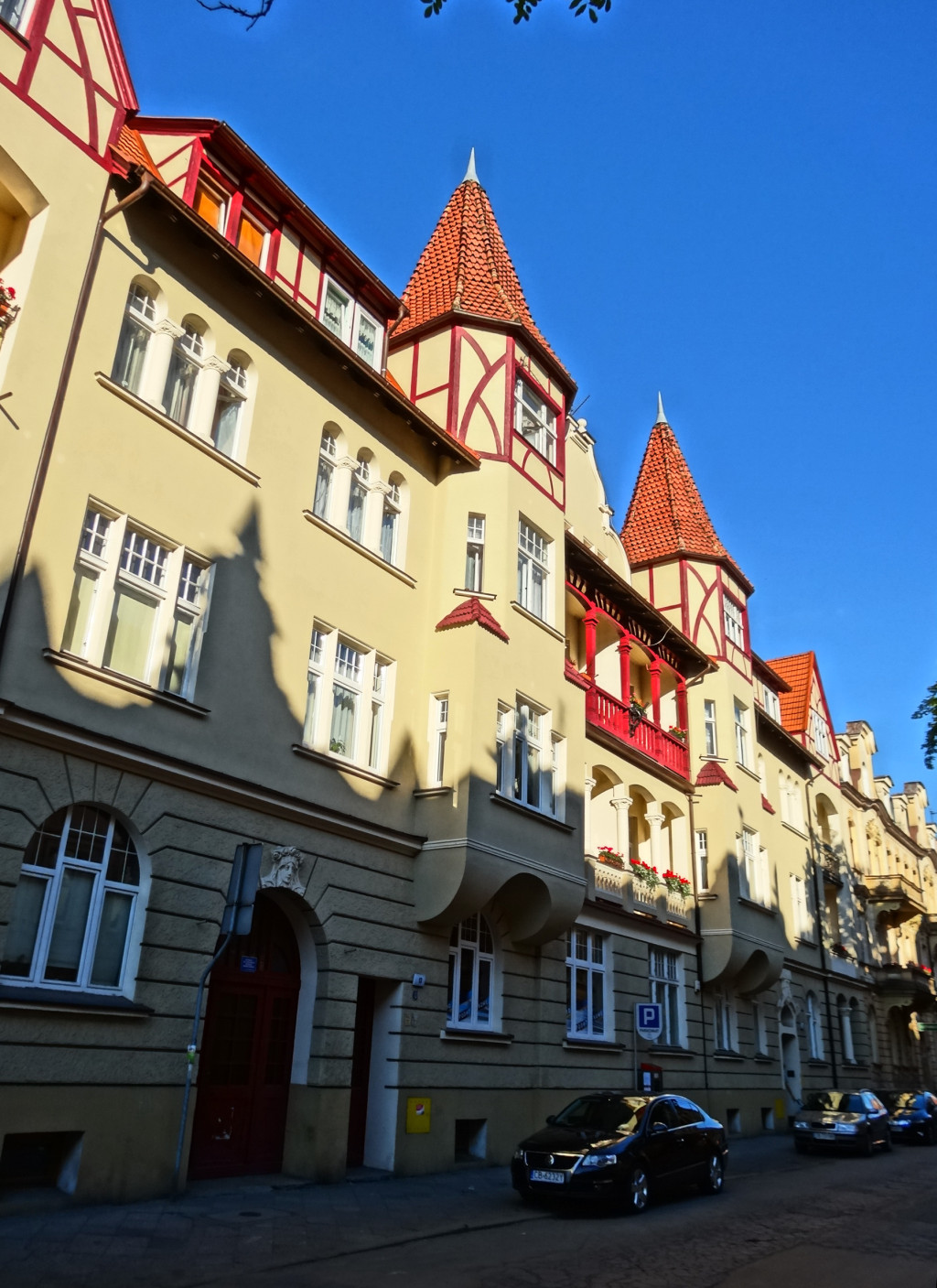
House at 13,15 Cieszkowskiego Street

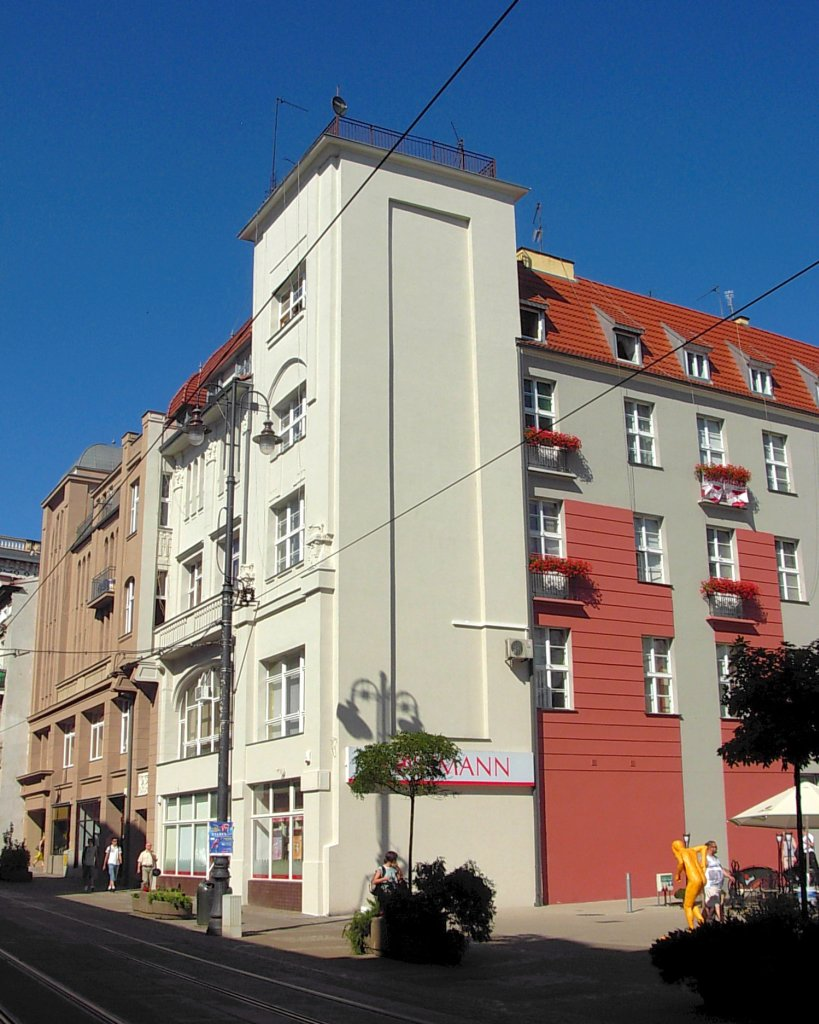
Tenement at 10 Gdańska Street

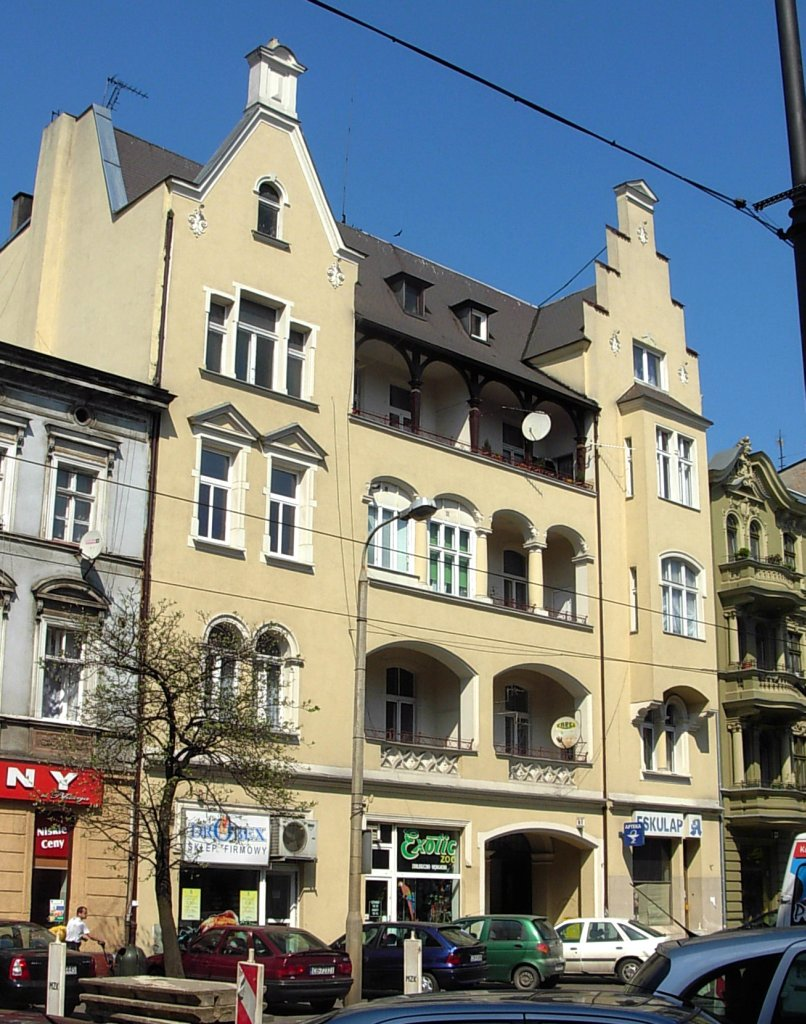
House at 91 Gdańska Street

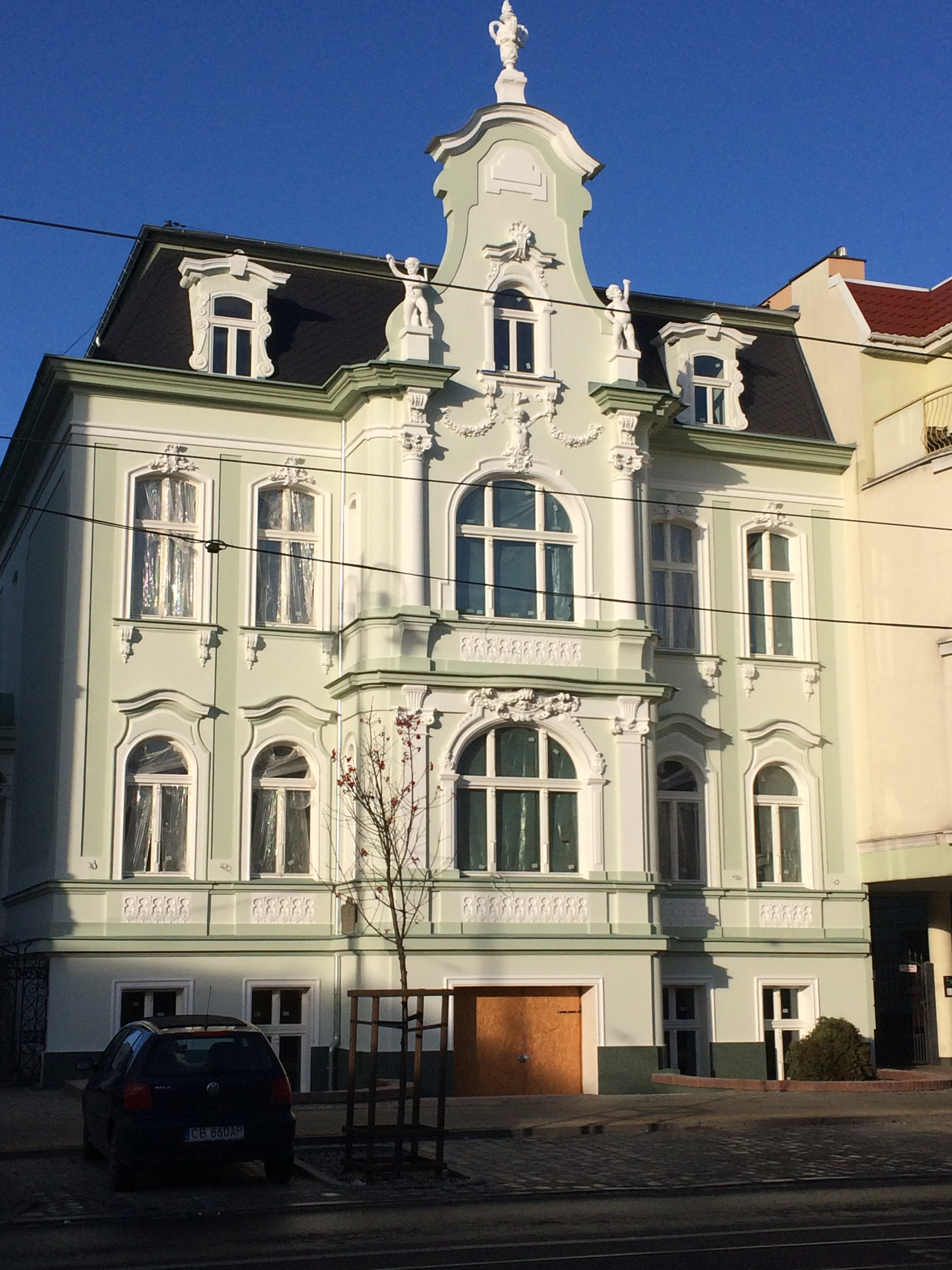
House at 119 Gdańska Street

==== Paul Böhm ====
Paul Böhm has been an architect working in Bydgoszcz during the middle of the 1890s and the first decade of the 20th century. He ran an architectural studio and a technical office. He owned the property at 109 Gdańska Street, which is non existent today. At the turn of the 19th and 20th centuries, he designed and built several houses along Cieszkowskiego Street.

Paul Böhm was an important representative of the Historicism trend in Bydgoszcz's architecture at the end of the 19th century. He turned to Art Nouveau at the beginning of the 20th century.

===== Paul Böhm's preserved accomplishments in Bydgoszcz =====
Year	Edifice	Remarks	Picture
1899	Bydgoszcz Tool Factory "BEFANA" at Marcinkowskiego Street	The firm, established in 1852, is producing metallic tools. It is one of the oldest firms in Bydgoszcz.	
1900–1901	House at 2 Królowej Jadwigi Street	Registered on Kuyavian-Pomeranian Voivodeship heritage list. The highest part displays in a medallion a figure of Tadeusz Kościuszko (by Piotr Triebler); above the medallion, a statue of Queen Jadwiga stands in a niche, towering the whole street that bears her name.	
1903–1905	House at 4 Królowej Jadwigi Street	Registered on Kuyavian-Pomeranian Voivodeship heritage list. Architecture style pertains to rural English houses (cottages).	
1903–1904	House at 1 Cieszkowskiego Street	Registered on Kuyavian-Pomeranian Voivodeship heritage list. Its original appearance has been reconstructed with restored architectural details during the renovation carried out in 1994.	
1903–1904	Paul Bohm's house at 3 Cieszkowskiego Street	Registered on Kuyavian-Pomeranian Voivodeship heritage list. It was the personal house of the architect.	
1908–1909	Tenement at 5 Weyssenhoff Square	Registered on Kuyavian-Pomeranian Voivodeship heritage list. The facade display 3 levels of balconies. The building has been recently refurbished.	
1904–1905	Tenement at 3 Słowackiego Street	Registered on Kuyavian-Pomeranian Voivodeship heritage list. The facade is characteristic of the eclectic style, mixing several references altogether..	
1910–1912	Tenement at 10/12 20 January 1920 street	Main elevation boasts early modernist architectural elements.	

==== Heinrich Seeling ====
Heinrich Seeling was born on October 1, 1852, in Zeulenroda-Triebes, Thuringia. His father, Christian Seeling, was a bricklayer, from an Evangelical Lutheran family. As a boy, he practiced with his father's bricklaying craftmen. After having completed a building school in Holzminden, he moved in 1870 to Berlin, where he worked in a construction workshop and joined as a free listener the Bauakademie (now Technische Universität Berlin). After three years of study, he went on an education trip to the south of the German Empire and to Vienna. He then returned to Berlin in 1874 and worked for 2 years in Hugo Licht's workshop. Aterwards, he went on a six-month study trip to Italy and came back to Berlin. In 1877, he started working as a first architect in the construction office of Hermann Ende. In January 1878 he won the second prize in the competition for the Town Hall in Kaława, which was carried out in 1880–1881. He then won the second prize for a theater project in Halle (1884–1886). The building was designed in accordance with the latest architectural tendencies and technical requirements; for this realization, Seelling was honored with the Prussian Order of the Crown - 4th Class.

From this moment, he devoted his architect's activity to theatre buildings: after designing the Stockholm Royal Theatre, he was appointed in 1890-1892 for the realization of the Municipal Theater in Essen, which designs pioneered many interior and façade solutions. Thanks to this project, he was published in leading architectural journals in Germany. Several projects were run in the following years:

- Berlin Theater am Schiffbauerdamm (1891–1892);
- Wuppertal town hall (1893);
- the 1000-seats Municipal Theater of Rostock, where he used a facade composition similar to Essen's;
- the Municipal Theatre in Bydgoszcz and Hanover town hall (1894–1896).

Seeling also built a group of houses at Schiklerestrasse in Berlin, where he applied solutions for modern residential and commercial construction. At the end of the 19th century, Heinrich Seeling was appointed member of the Royal Academy in Berlin.

At the start of the 20th century, he shared his time between constructions in Bydgoszcz, such as:

- the Church of Christ the Savior;
- the Villa Heinrich Dietz;
- Saint Andrew Bobola's Church;

and other projects in the German Empire, among others:

- Municipal Theaters in Aachen (1901), Frankfurt am Main (1902);
- acourt theatre in Gera.

One must notice that Henrich Seeling designed only 2 churches in all his career, and both are located in Bydgoszcz (Protestant Church of Christ the Savior and St Andrew Bobola).

In the years 1904–1910 theaters still remained in the main circle of his interests. He designed, among others:

- Braunschweig court theater with 1700 seats;
- Nuremberg, Kiel and Freiburg im Breisgau Municipal Theaters;
- AEG store in Berlin.

In 1908, Seeling was elected city building councilor of Charlottenburg, where, in the following years, he designed many edifices. His crowning achievement was the realization of the five-storey Deutsches Opernhaus in 1911–1912, able to house 2300 show-goers; it was the most modern stage installation and original architectural building of its time.

Heinrich Christian Seeling died on February 15, 1932, in Berlin.

===== Heinrich Seeling's achievements in Bydgoszcz =====
Year	Edifice	Remarks	Picture
1895–1896	Former Municipal Theatre	In 1945, during the fighting for the liberation of the city, the theatre building was hit by incendiary ammunitions, which set fire to the inside, where Soviet soldiers were billeted. the ruined site was razed in 1946.	
1896–1897	Church of the Savior	After WWII, the tower has been rebuilt according to the design of the architect Jan Kossowski	
1892–1893	Villa Heinrich Dietz	Registered on Kuyavian-Pomeranian Voivodeship heritage list, the house is located at 48 Gdańska Street. Today it accommodates the Pomerania and Kujawy Polish Radio (Polish: Polskie Radio Pomorza i Kujaw (Radio PiK)).	
1901–1903	Saint Andrew Bobola's Church	Registered on Kuyavian-Pomeranian Voivodeship heritage list, the edifice was initially conceived as a Protestant temple.	
1910–1912	Emil Werckmeister tenement	The building was erected at the end of the 19th century on the site of demolished granaries where was housed since 1907 the winery "Werckmeister". The house is located at 4 Jagiellońska street.	

==== Erich Lindenburger ====
Erich Lindenburger (1882–1978) was a German architect who worked in Bydgoszcz in the first two decades of the 20th century. His father, Friedrich Lindenburger, and his wife, Gertrude, settled in Bydgoszcz at 13 Orla Street (in today's Szwederowo district) in the 1850s. At the beginning of the 20th century, he worked as a construction technician. In 1904, Erich Lindenburger designed his own tenement house at 3 Adam Mickiewicz Avenue and opened his architectural office there. He designed representative, metropolitan tenement houses in a style reminiscent of architectural trends from the early 1900s, mainly referring to Art Nouveau (e.g. tenements at 43, 45, and 47 Dworcowa Street).

===== Erich Lindenburger's achievements in Bydgoszcz =====
Year	Edifice	Remarks	Picture
1904–1905	Tenement at 3 Adam Mickiewicz Alley	Facades display Art Nouveau forms.	
1904	Tenement at 41 Dworcowa Street	Frontages renovated in 2015, have Neo-baroque and early Modernist elements	
1904	Willy Grawunder Tenement	Located at 45 Dworcowa Street. In the 1920s, Willy Jahr, a successful owner of a bicycle factory at 89 Nakielska street, opened there a selling point for his production.	
1905	Bruno Grawunder Tenement	Located at 47 Dworcowa Street. Bruno Grawunder, a jeweler, was a relative of Wilhelm, owner of Nr.45.	
1900s	House at 1 Śląska Street	Frontage details did not survive. A characteristic ridge turret tops the corner building.	
1905–1906	House at 9 Marcinkowskiego Street	The building still possesses beautifully preserved Art Nouveau elements.	
1905–1910	Tenements at 10/12 Śląska Street		
1905–1910	Tenement at 3 Józef Weyssenhoff Square	Frontage displays Art Nouveau elements.	
1905–1910	Hermann Berndt Tenement	Located at 32 Gdańska Street, the original house from 1881 has been rebuilt in 1910–1911 by Erich Lindenburger, as commissioned by the new landlord Leo Venske.	
1909–1910	Villa at 4 Chodkiewicza Street	The first landlord was Richard Von Colbe, a rentier. The house, though damaged, exhibits early modern architectural style.	
1909–1910	Villa at 6 Chodkiewicza Street	Karl Magdaliński, a land owner, was the first landlord proprietor of the house.	

==== Rudolf Kern ====
Rudolf Kern probably practiced in the studio of Józef Święcicki. From 1903 to the early 1920s, he ran his own architectural and construction office. Like many other colleagues from Bydgoszcz, he was involved in the design and construction of tenement houses in Cieszkowskiego Street. In Bydgoszcz, he lived in his own house at 72 Gdańska street.

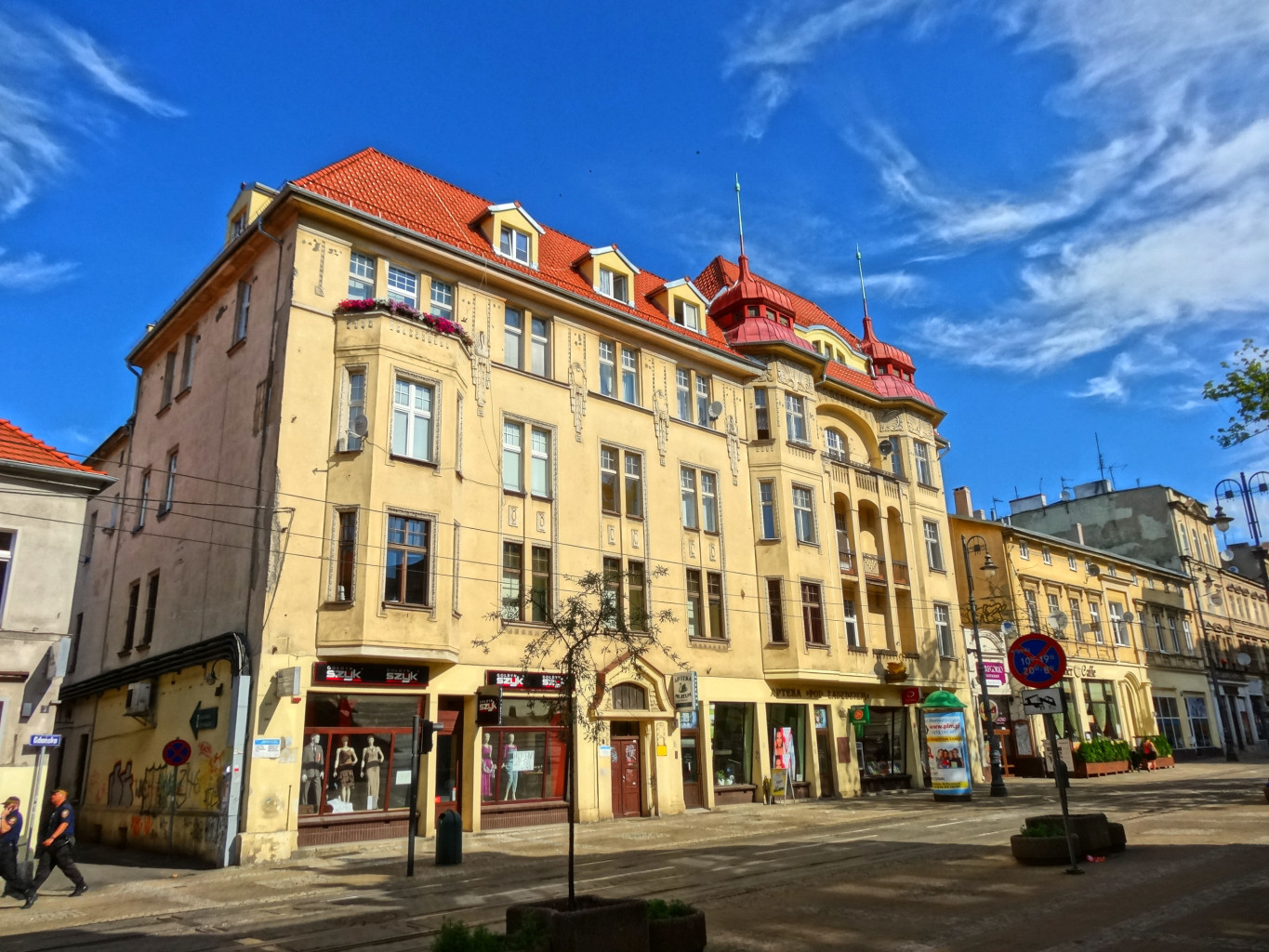
August Mentzel Tenement

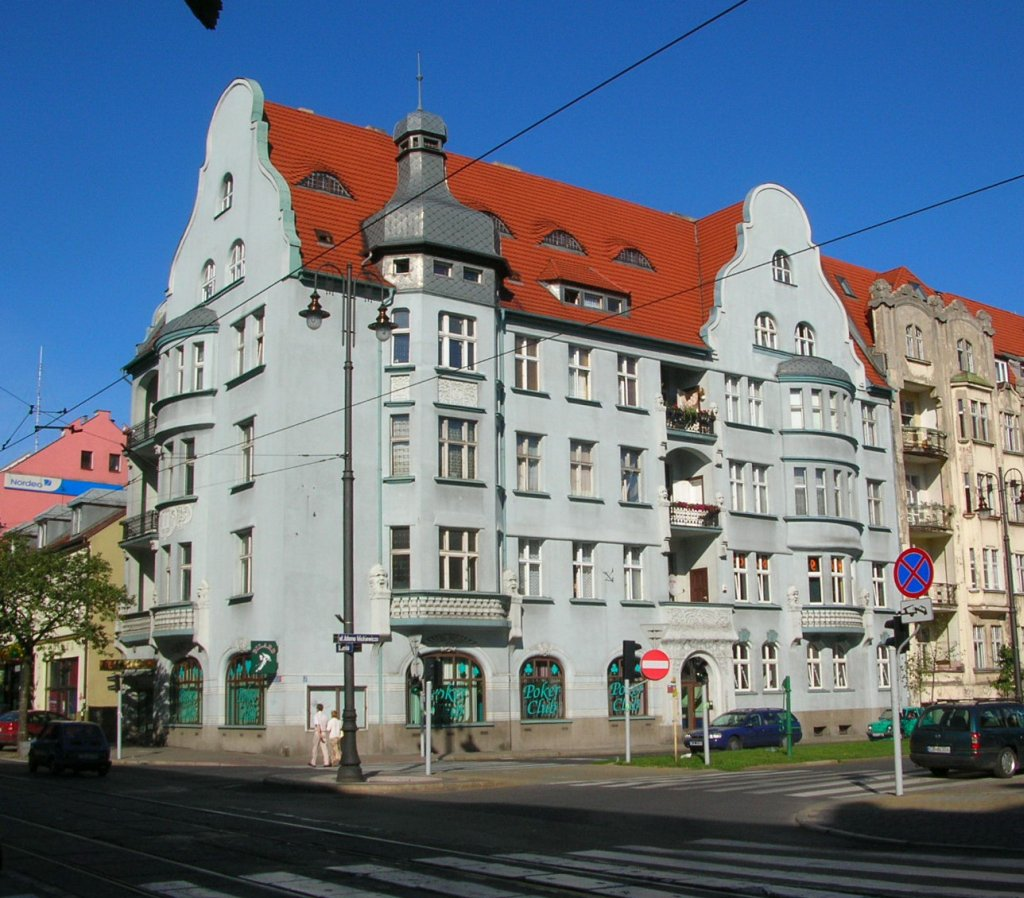
Rudolf Kern Building

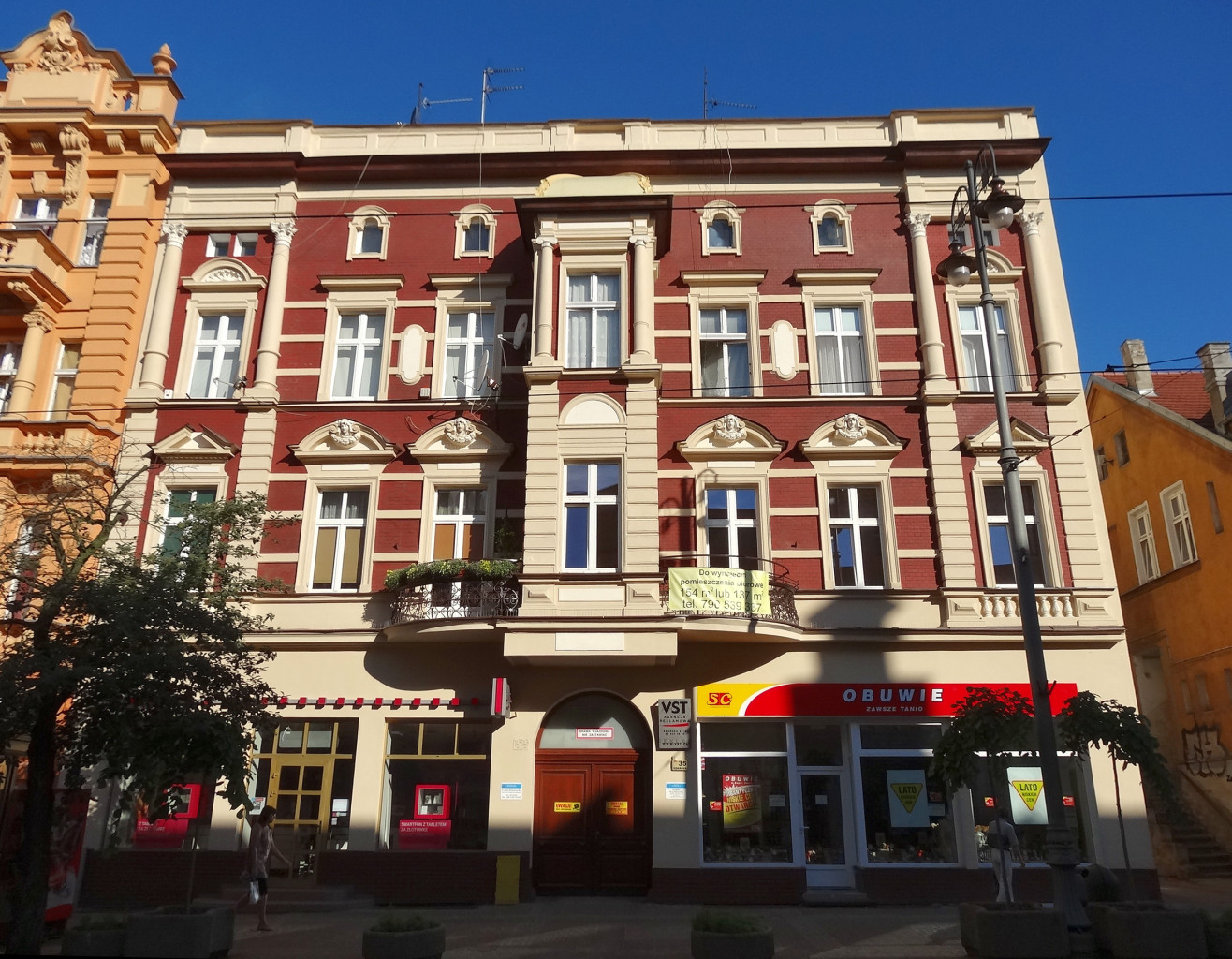
Julius Grey house

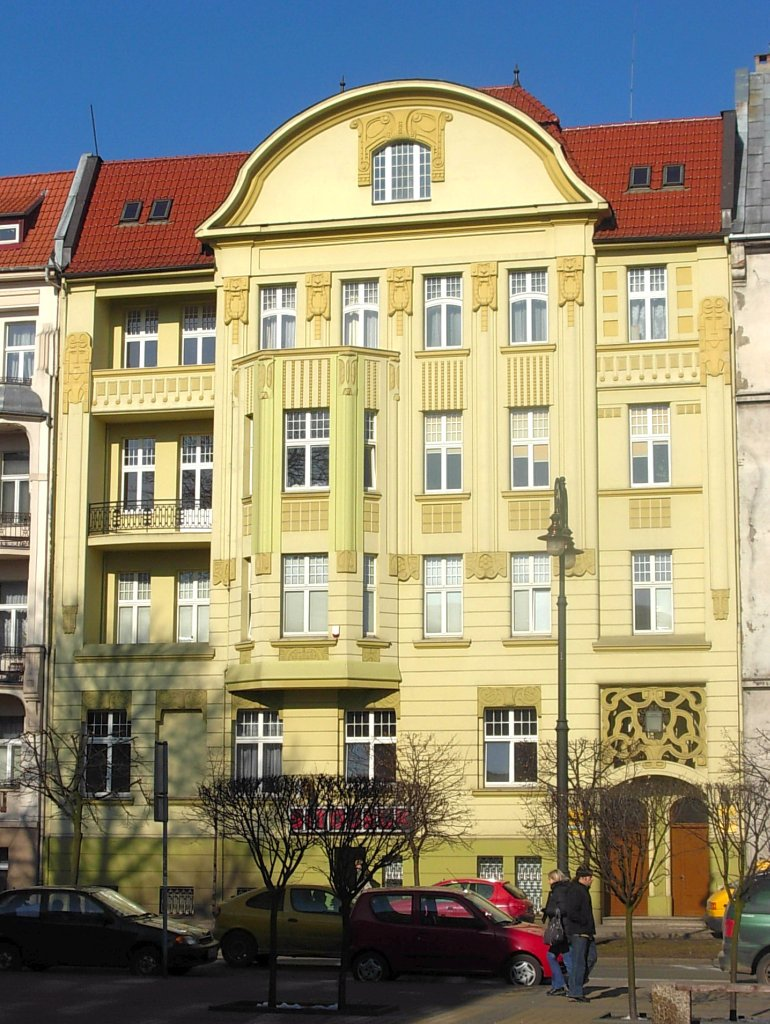
Tenement at Adam Mickiewicz Alley 9

==== Alfred Schleusener ====
Alfred Schleusener was active in Bydgoszcz from 1905 to 1944. He ran an architectural office. He was also a construction expert and a member of the State Chamber of Building.

===== Alfred Schleusener's preserved accomplishments in Bydgoszcz =====
Year	Edifice	Remarks	Picture
1905–1906	Robert Grundtmann Tenement at 1 Słowackiego Street	Robert Grundtmann was a retired colonel of the Prussian army. The initial address was Bismarckstraße 1.	
1908	Alfred Schleusener Villa at 7 20 Stycznia 1920 Street	The villa reflects architectural tendencies on the fringe between Art Nouveau and early modernism. It was the personal house of the architect.	
1908–1909	Carl Meinhardt tenement at 27 Gdańska Street	The house was built between for a restaurateur, Carl Meinhardt. Previously on this site stood the villa of Georg Minde-Pouet (1871–1950), first director of the Provincial and Municipal Public Library in Bydgoszcz, which was housed there from 1904 to 1906	
1910–1911	Alfred Schleusener Tenement at 62 Gdańska Street	The building owned by the architect, had a residential wing distinct from the business and trade premises.	
1911	Villa at 8 Chodkiewicza Street	During WWII, the house was occupied by the Gestapo. In 1945, it was taken over by the NKVD and then by the Ministry of Public Security, better known as UB. This office arranged there a Police departement for children in the end of the 1970s, which closed in 2010.	
1912	Building at 19 Kordeckiego street	Renovated in mid-2016, the villa decoration uses stucco motifs: from the columns flanking the door to the cartouches between windows to the festoons on the wall gable. Wood for the balcony or wrought iron on the railing are also utilised.	

==== Paul Sellner ====
Paul Sellner had a professional practice around 1902–1904, which began in the workshop of Bydgoszcz architect Karl Bergner. In 1904, as an architect, he opened an independent architectural office, which he ran until at least 1915. He lived in Bydgoszcz until 1922.

His style is creative, applied to representative, metropolitan houses in the style of early modernism.

===== Paul Sellner's preserved accomplishments in Bydgoszcz =====
Year	Edifice	Remarks	Picture
1905	House at 1 Paderewskiego Street	Built in the first years of the 20th century on a commission by Wilhelm Knelke, a manufacturer.	
1905–1907	Paul Sellner Tenement	Located at 10 Paderewskiego Street, it was the personal house of the architect.	
1911–1912	Otto Riedl Tenement in Bydgoszcz	The house was built for the baker (German: bäckermeister) Otto Riedel.	
1905–1907	Tenement at 95 Gdańska street	The facade displays early modernist forms.	
1911	Building at 18 Paderewskiego Street	Like many of the neighbouring tenements, the architectural style shifts to modernism, while keeping patches of eclectic details	
1906	Building at 27 Chocimska street	The edifice was commissioned by entrepreneur Antoni Weynerowski to house its shoe factory "LEO"	

==== Ernst Peters ====
Ernst Peters came from Berlin, where he had been running from 1885 an architecture studio with Bernhard Sehring, located at "11 Charlottenstrasse".

He was active in Bydgoszcz only from 1901 to 1907.

Ernst Peter used to apply Berlin Art Nouveau details on his edifices: masks, heads, figures, plants and sea waves, atlantes, female figures.

===== Ernst Peters's preserved accomplishments in Bydgoszcz =====
Year	Edifice	Remarks	Picture
1903–1904	Tenement at 5 Cieszkowskiego Street	It was one of the last tenements built in Cieszkowskiego Street. Ernst designed the interiors.	
1903	Tenement at 23 Świętej Trojcy street	The project was a re-building of the edifice, for Franciszek Ciechanowski, a master builder. Ernst designed the interiors.	
1904	Tenement at 4 Kujawska street	Extension of the original villa, owned by the Kolwitz family. Ernst designed the interiors.	

==== Other active Prussian architects ====
Friedrich Meyer
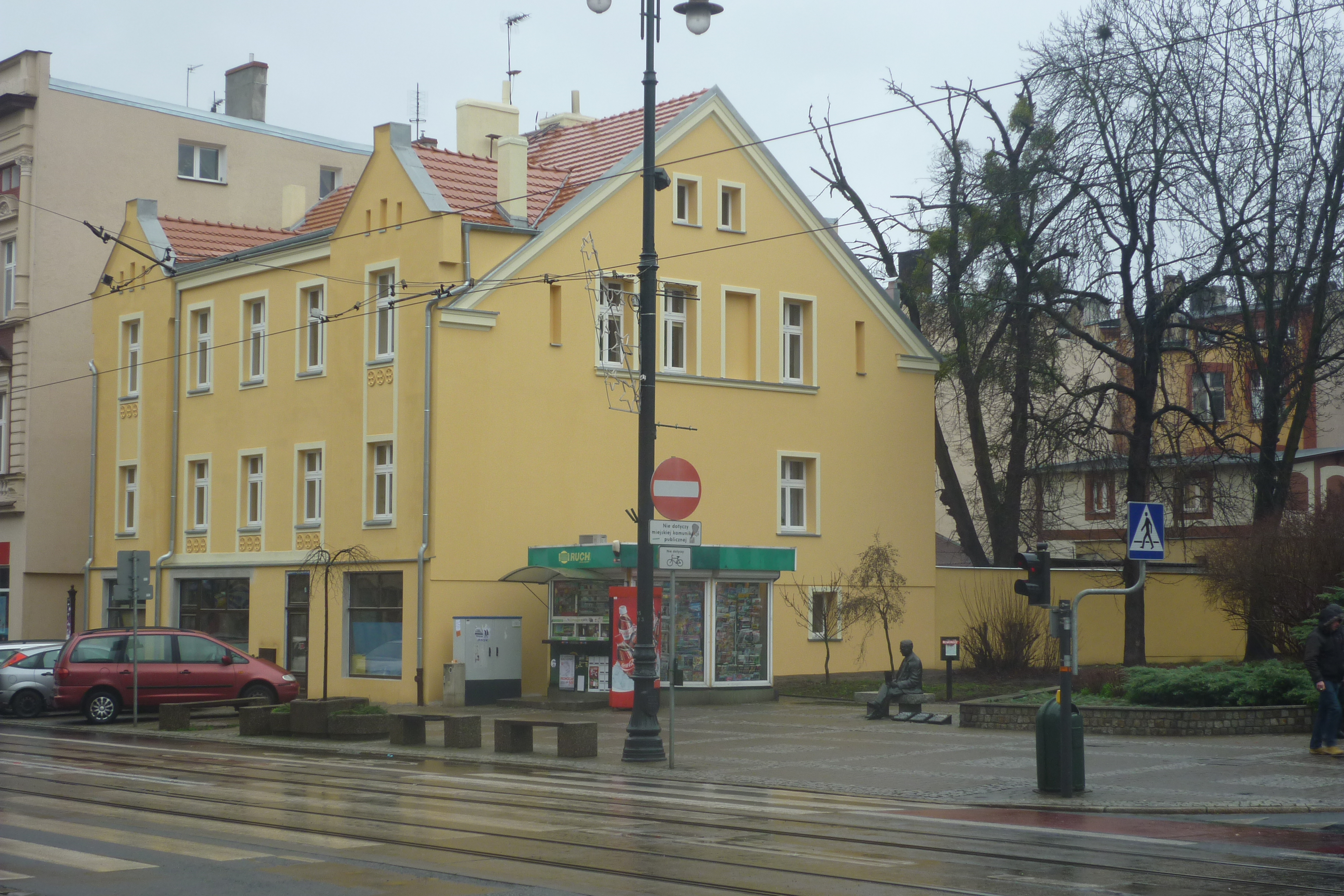
House at 37 Gdańska Street (1853), one of the oldest building in the main thoroughfare.

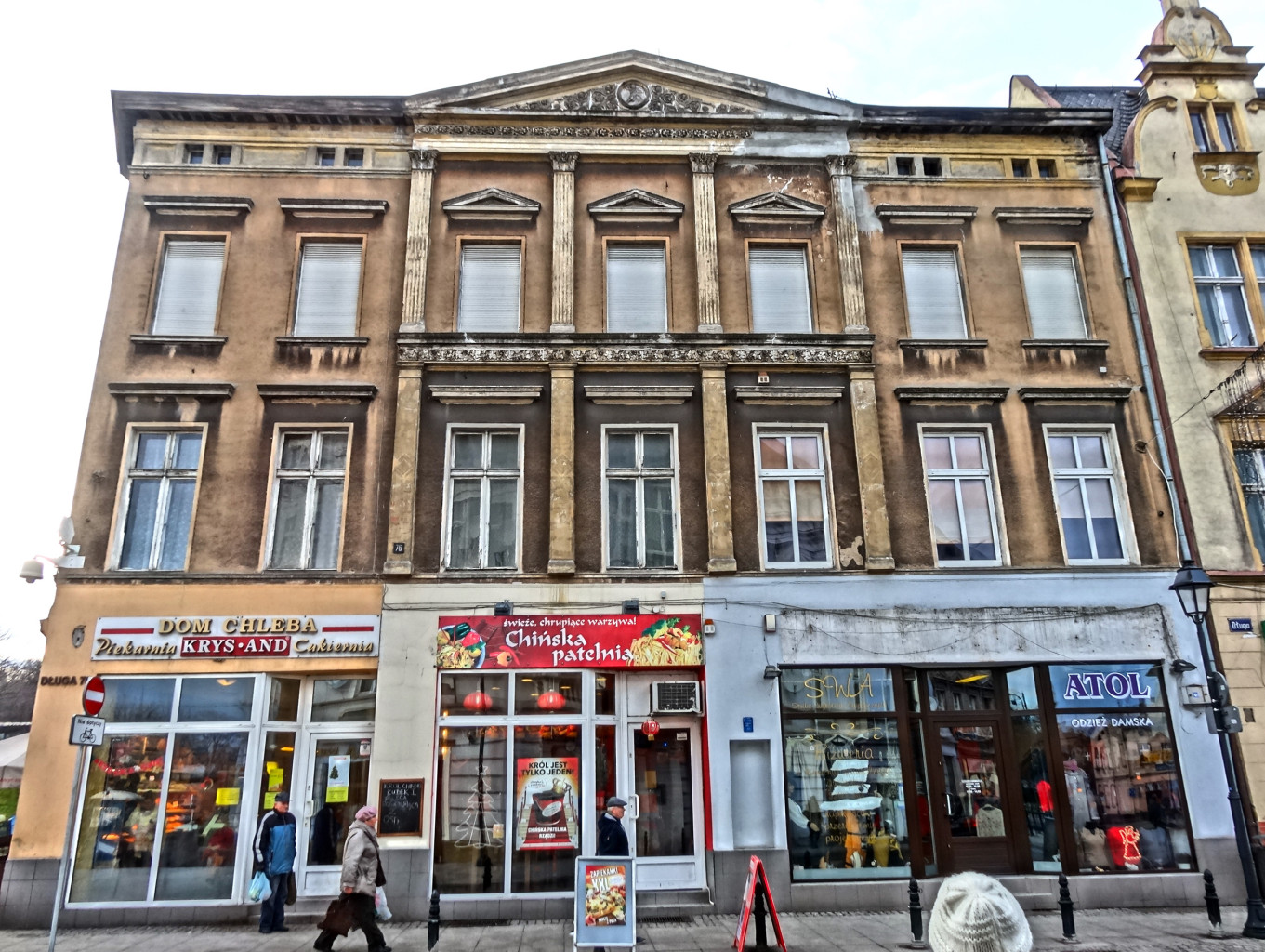
Tenement at 76 Długa street (1870).
Gustav Weihe
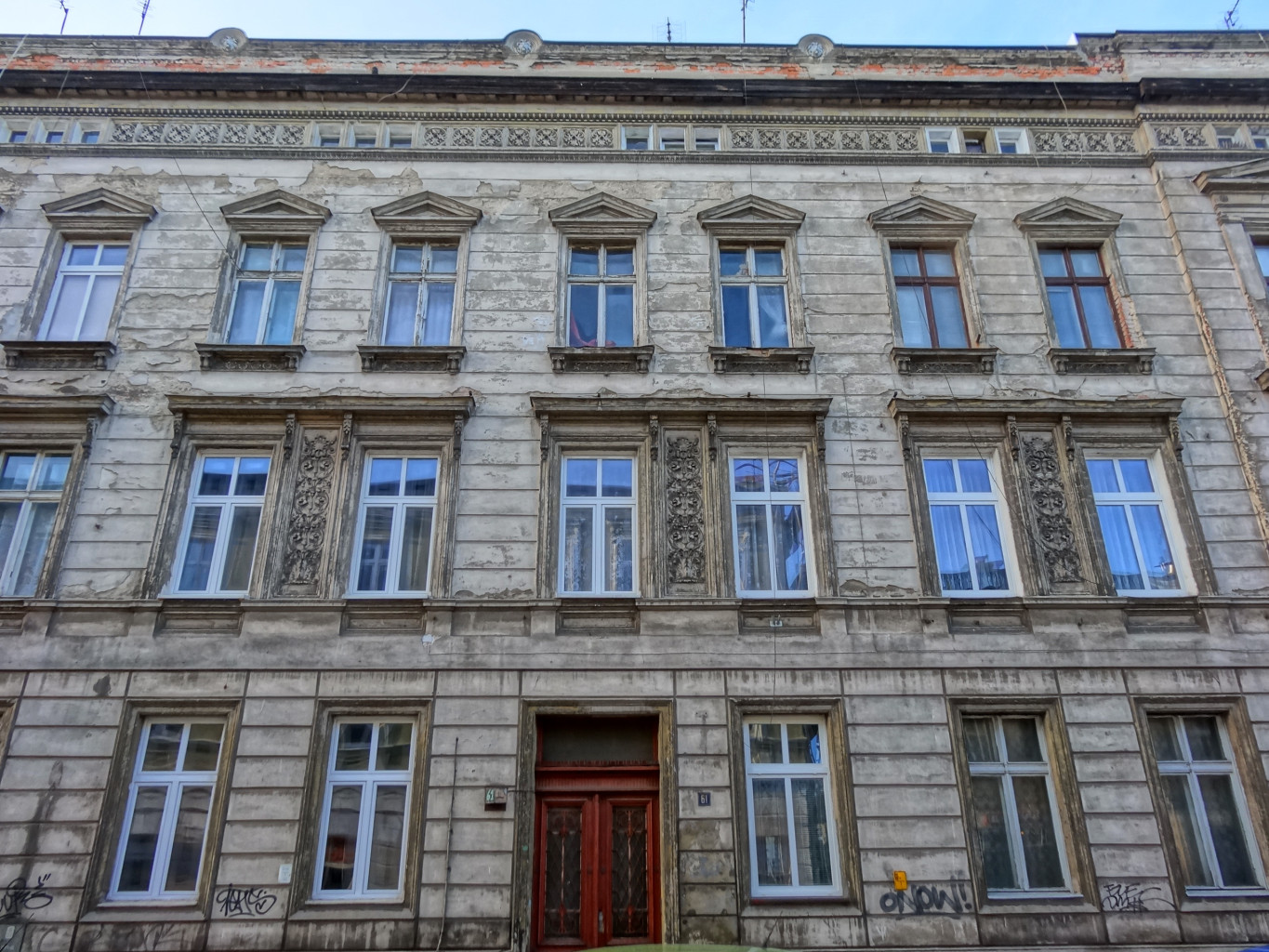
Tenement at 61 Dworcowa Street (1873–1874).

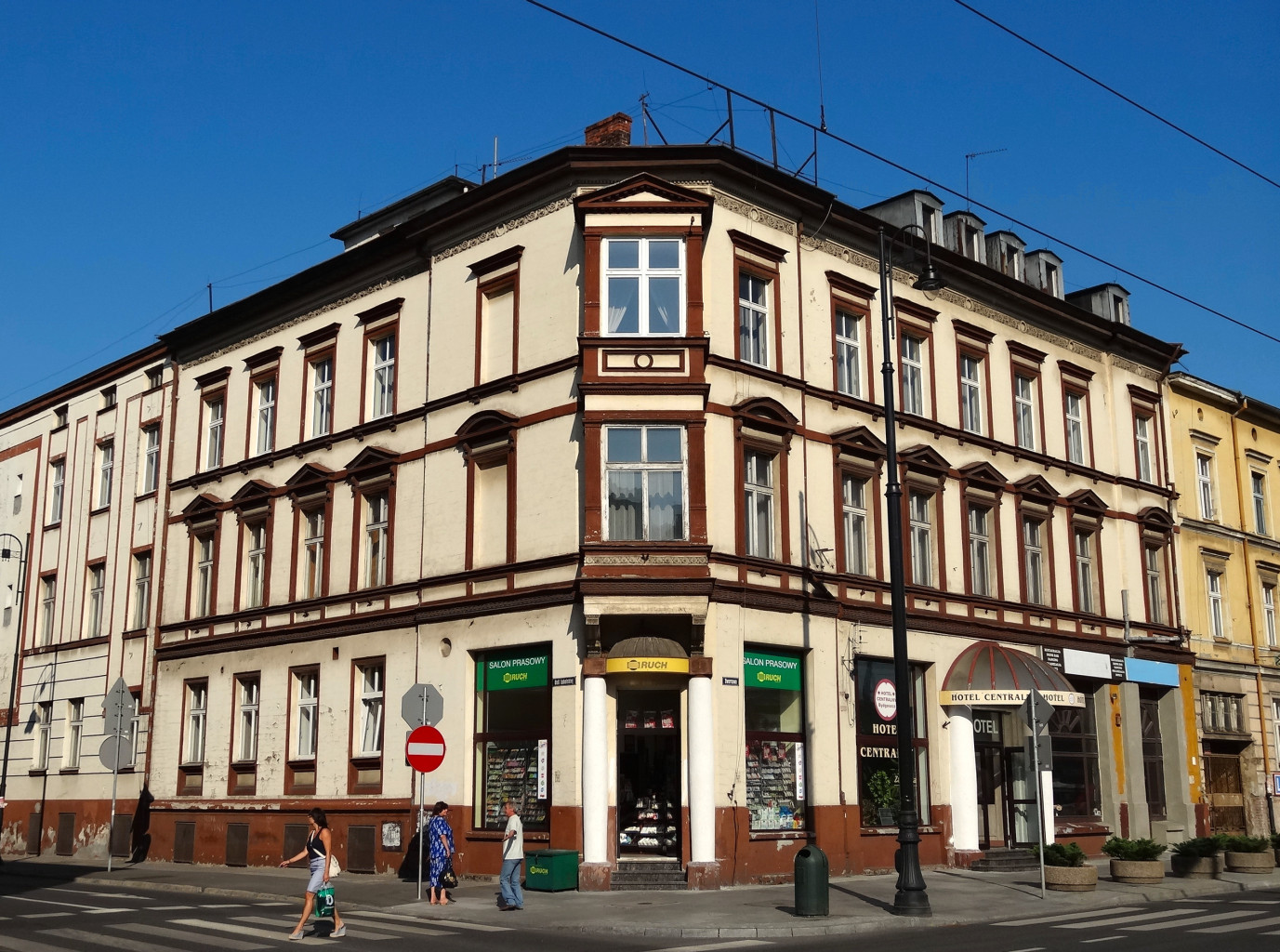
Hotel Centralny at 85 Dworcowa Street (1875–1876).

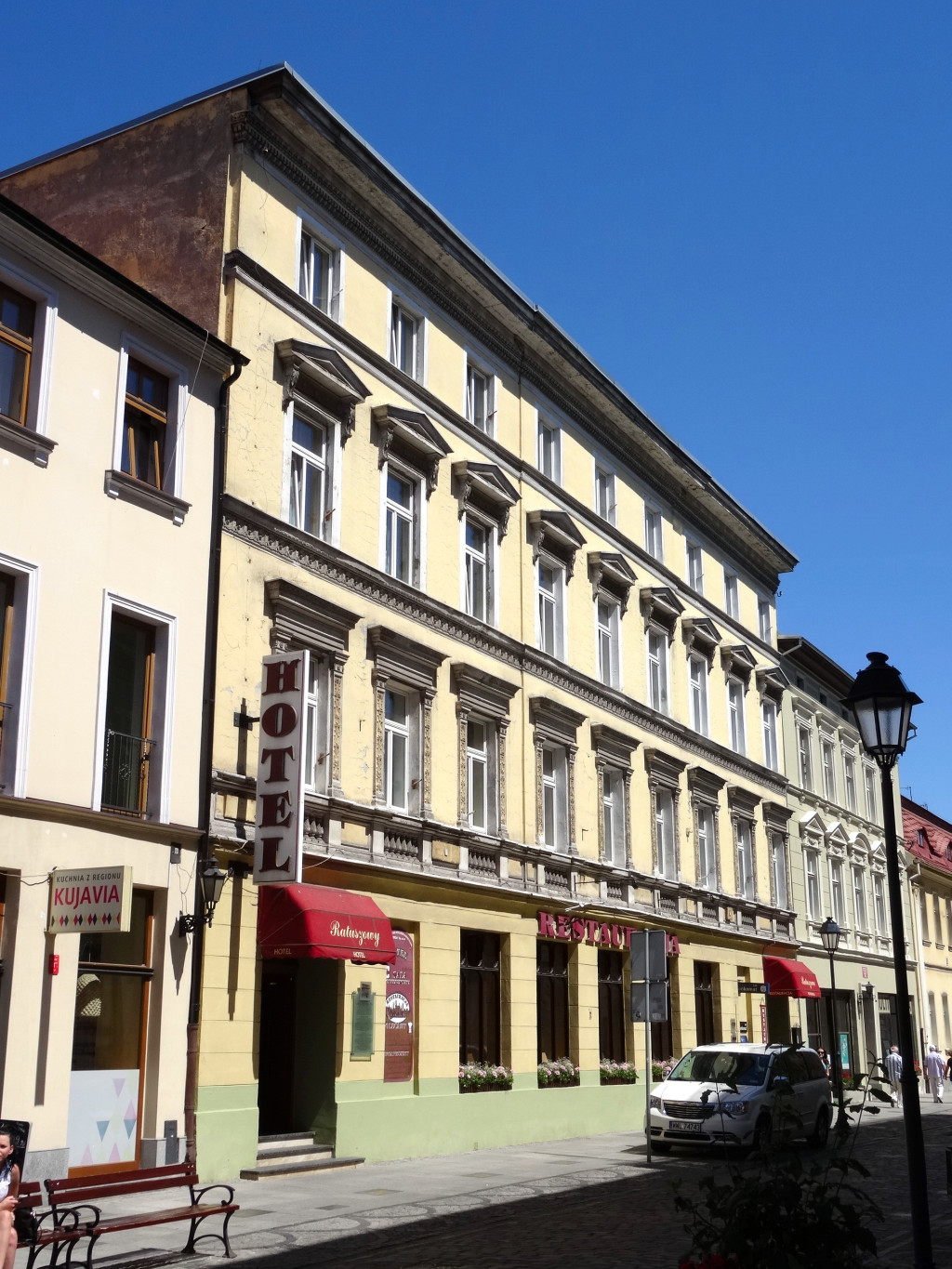
Hotel Ratuszowy at 37 Długa street (1880–1884), registered on Kuyavian-Pomeranian Heritage list. The initial edifice erected between 1830 and 1833 was designed to be an outbuilding for the administrative purposes benefit of the Town Hall.

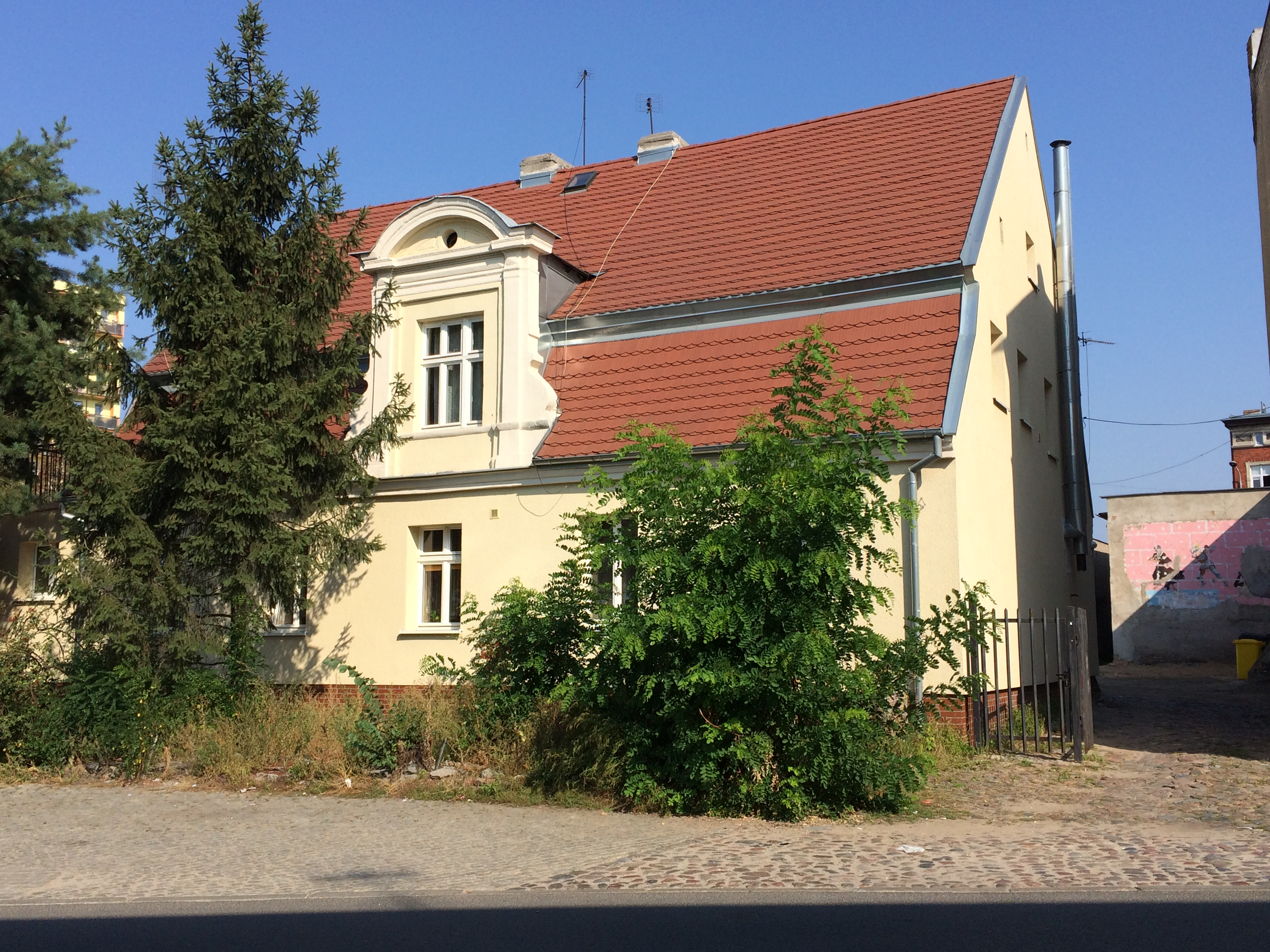
Gustav Weihe's house at 20 Świętej Trojcy street (1869), own house of the architect.

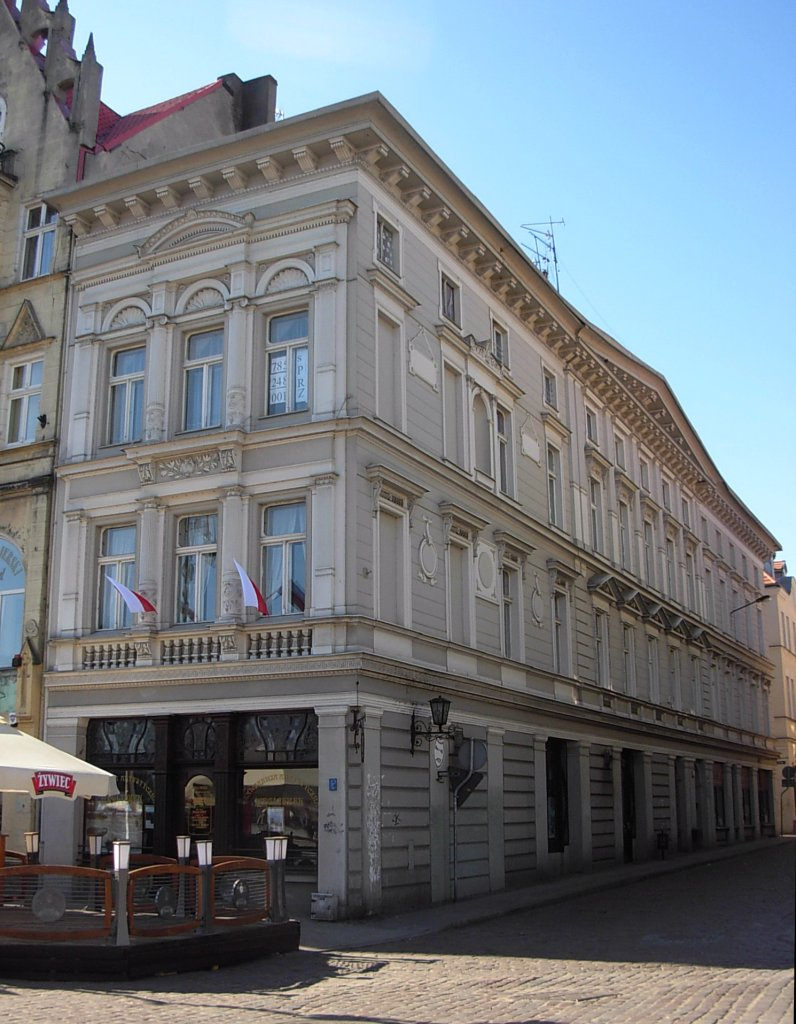
Registered on Kuyavian-Pomeranian Heritage list, this tenement at 12 Stary Rynek is the result of a thorough reconstruction made in 1877. The building has gothic cellars from the 15th century.
Georg Weiß
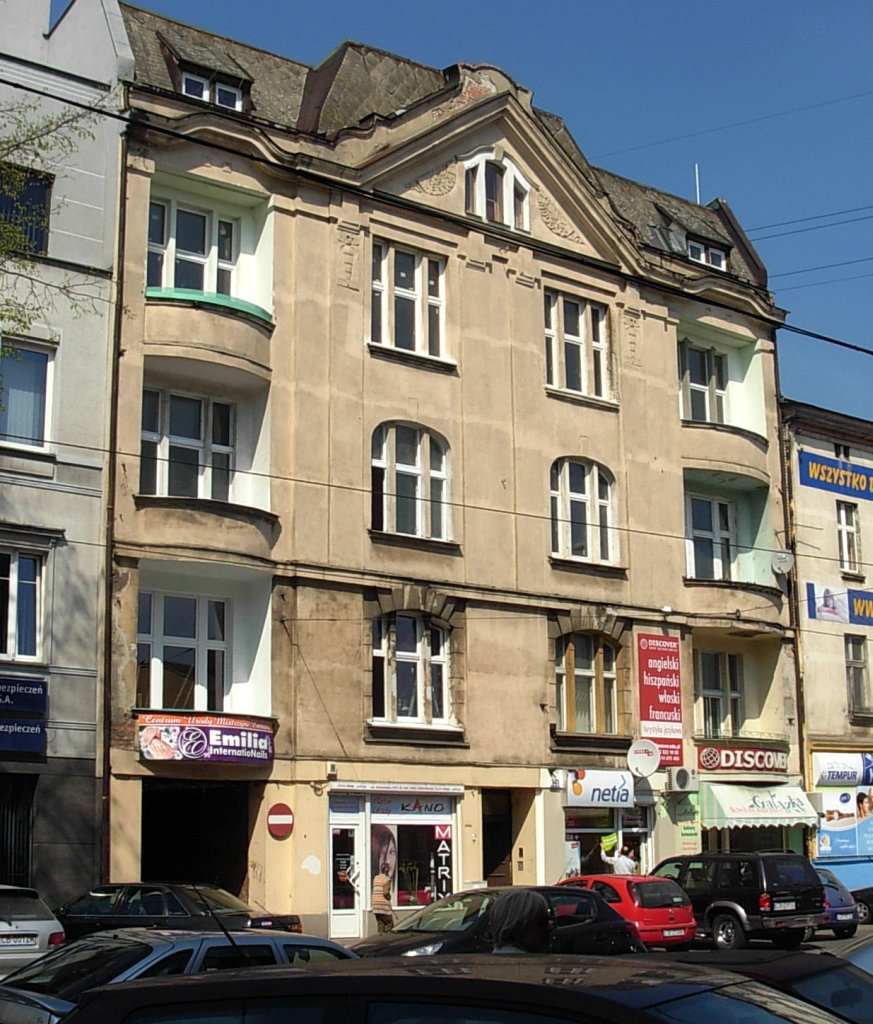
Georg Weiß tenement at 141 Gdańska Street (1906–1907), architect's own house.

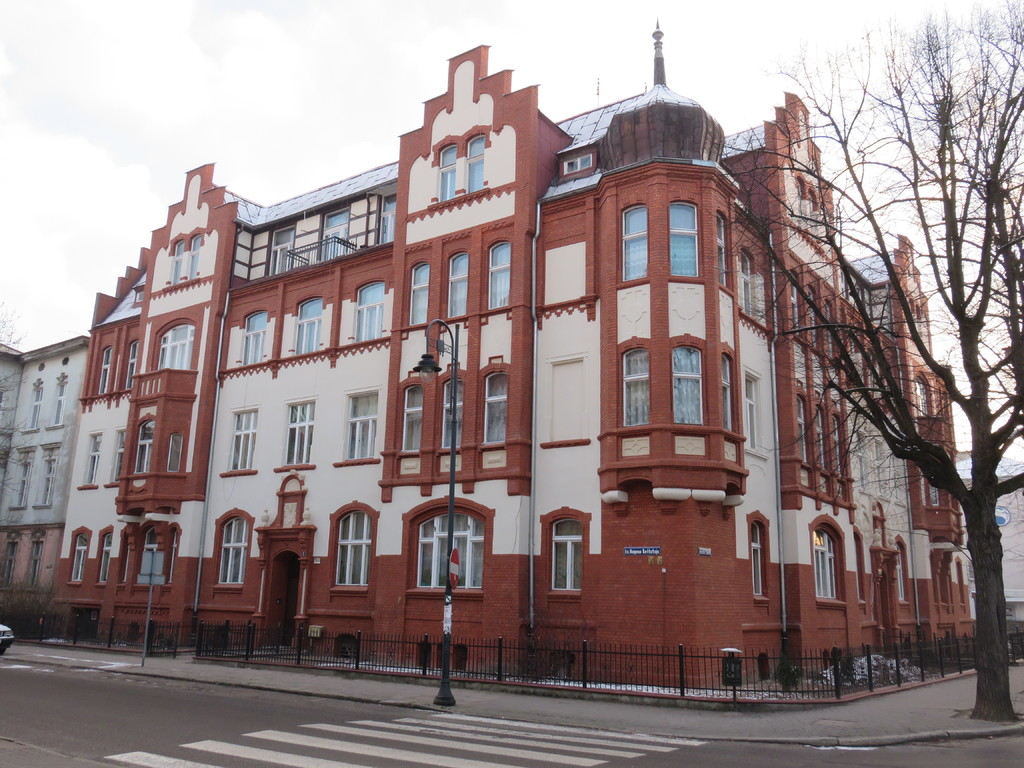
Tenement at 2 Kołłątaja street (1870), registered on Kuyavian-Pomeranian Heritage list.
Theodore Patzwald
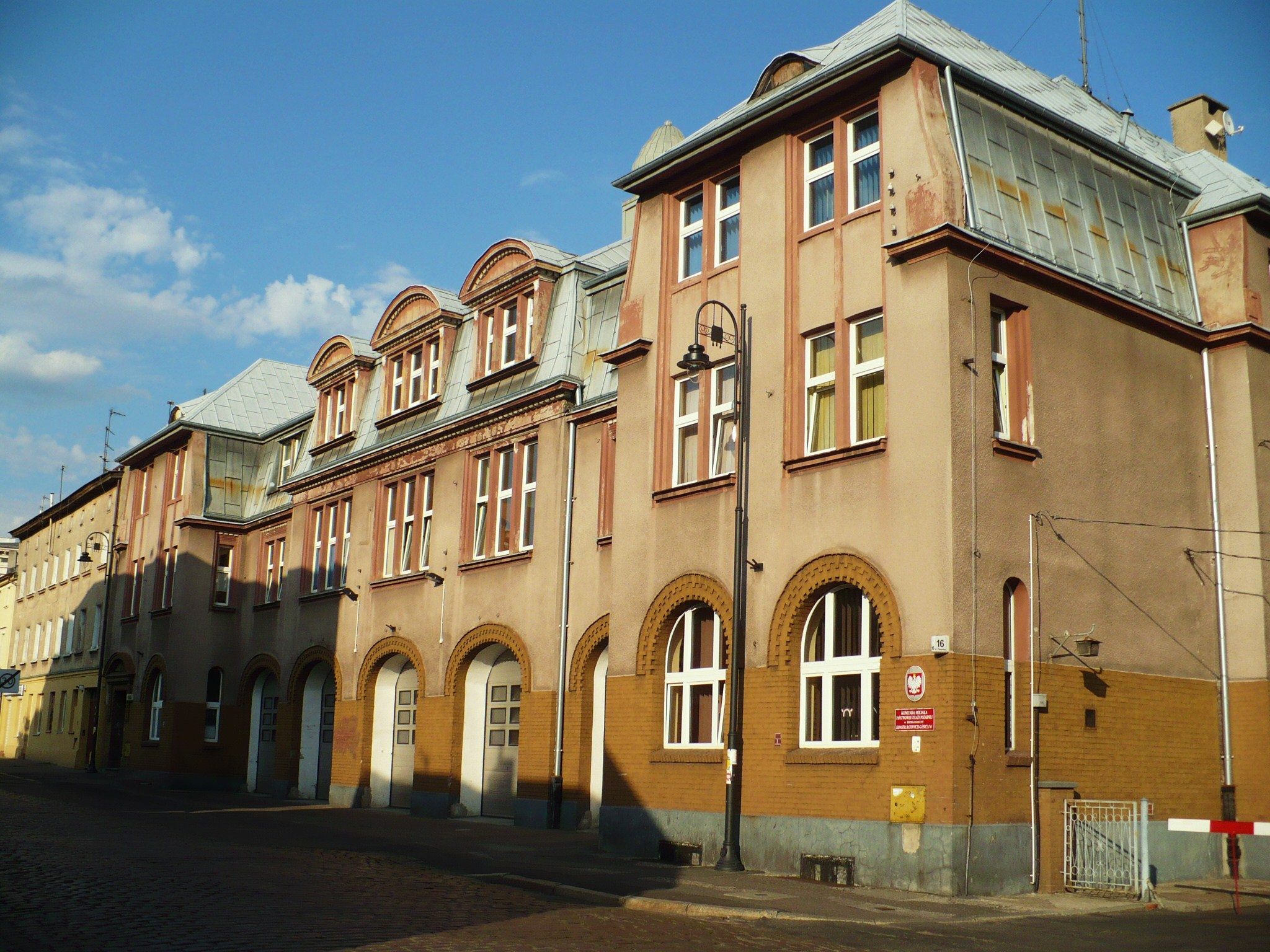
City fire station (1909), at 16/18 Pomorska Street

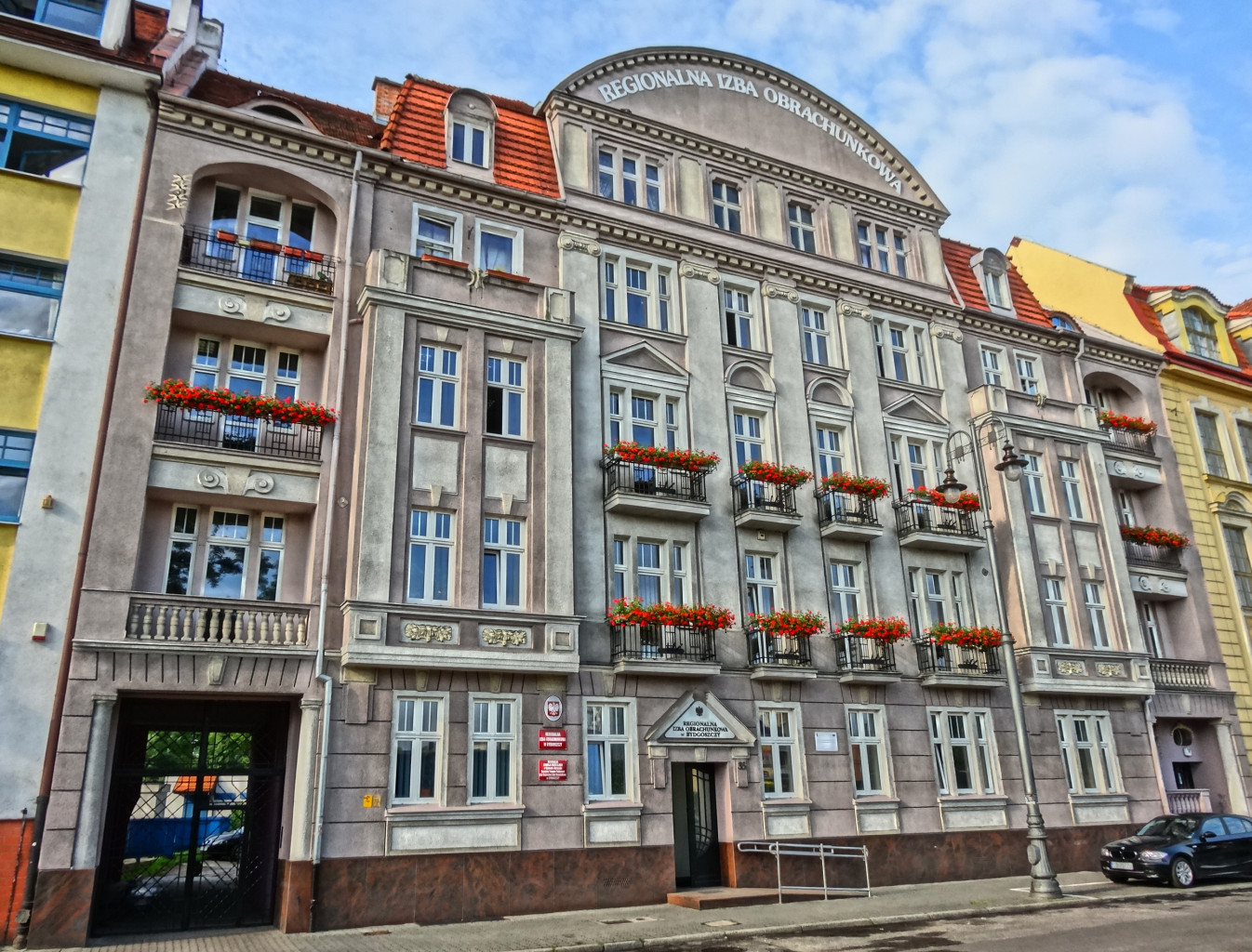
Tenement at 35 Świętej Trojcy street (1912–1913)

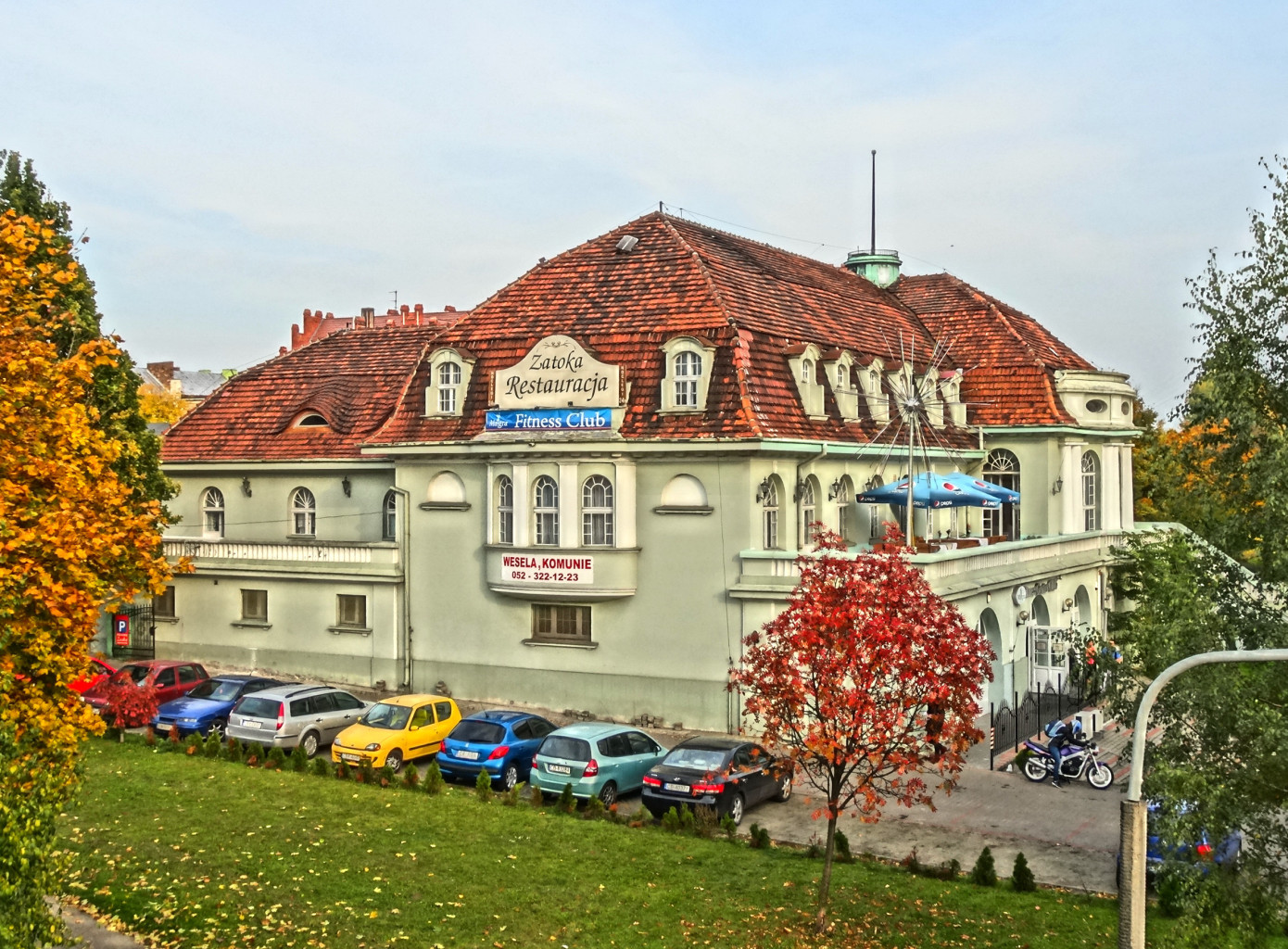
Former building of Bydgoszcz Rowing Association (1914) at Bernardyńska Street, registered on Kuyavian-Pomeranian Heritage list

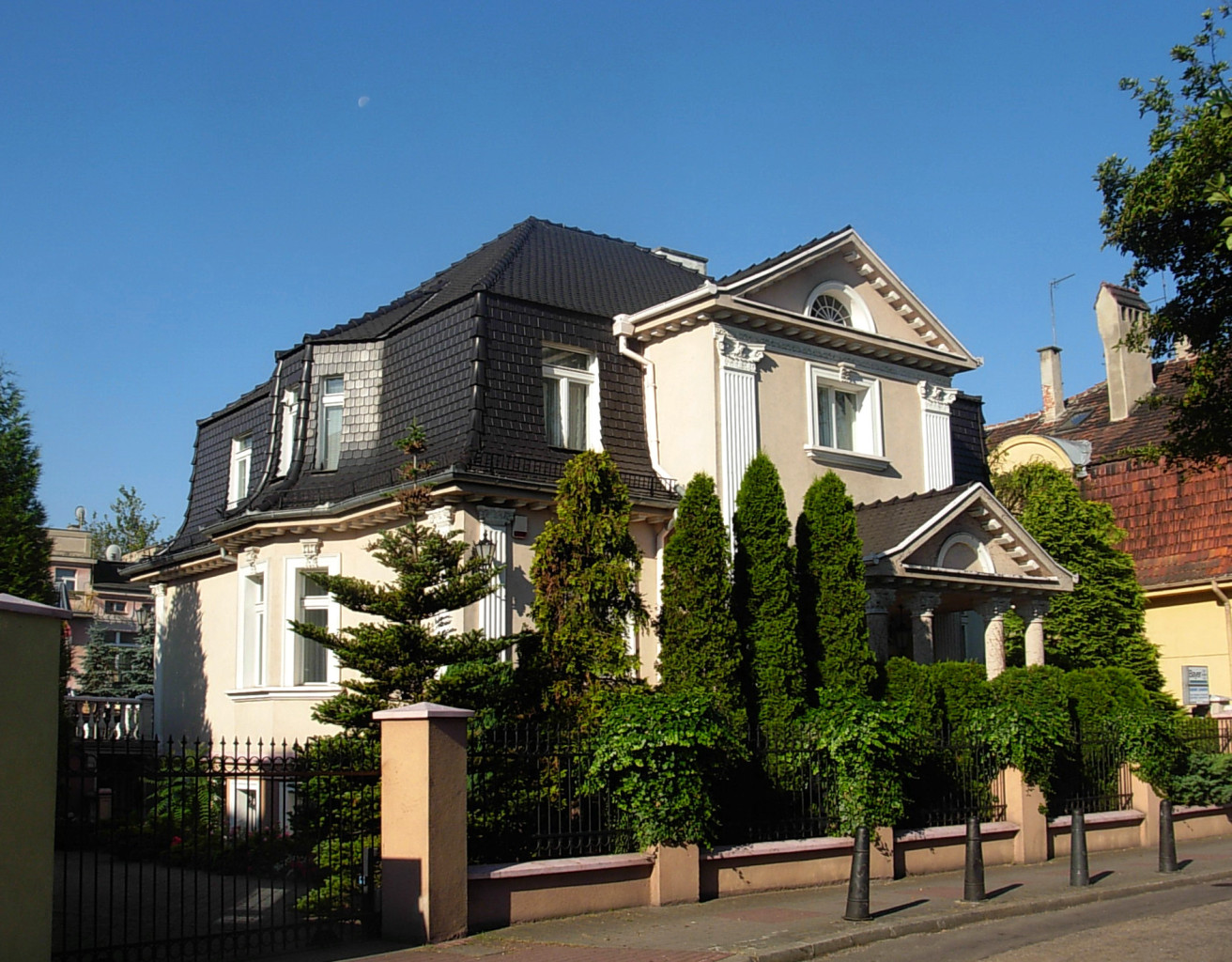
Villa at 8 Wyspianskiego street (1914–1917)
Georg Baesler
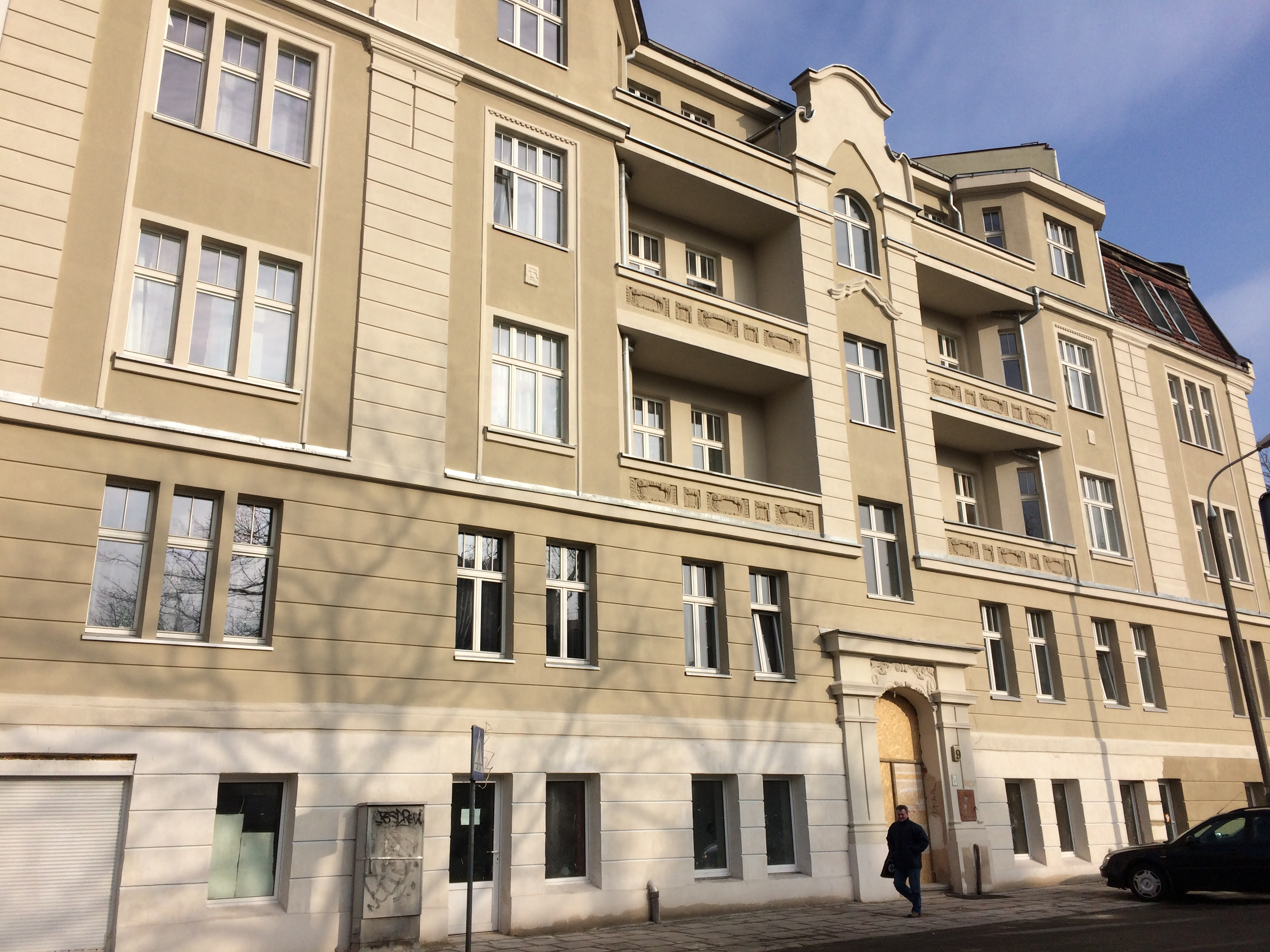
Tenement at 9 Józef Weyssenhoff Square (1910–1911), registered on Kuyavian-Pomeranian Heritage list

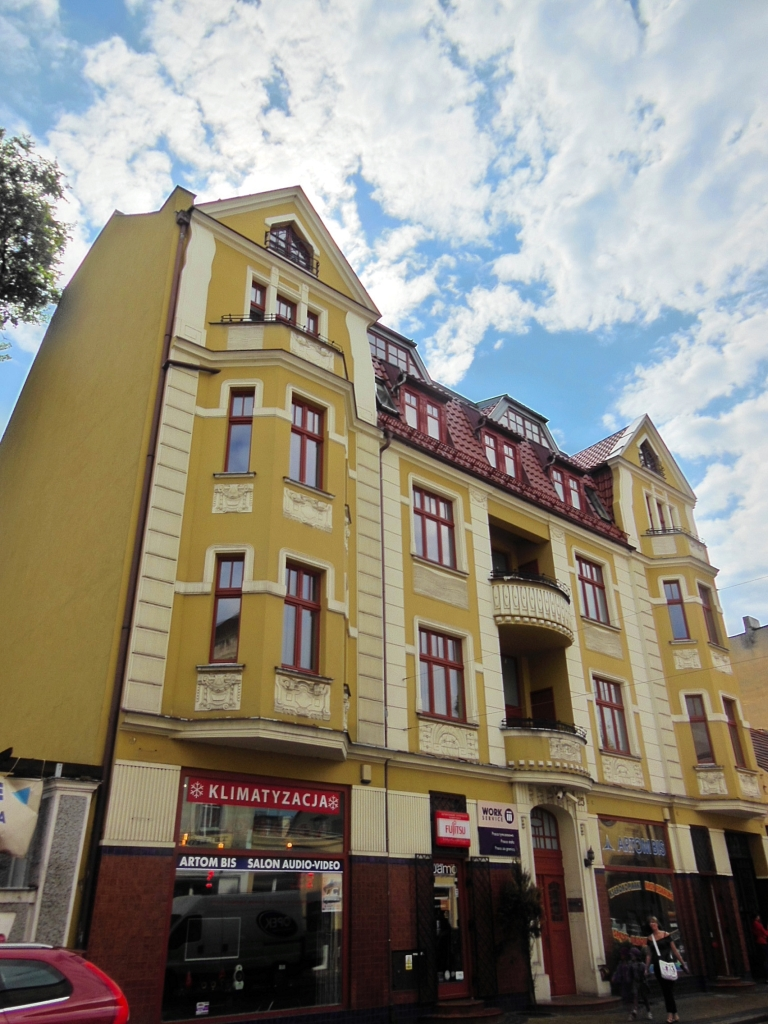
Tenement at 25 Śniadecki Street (1911)

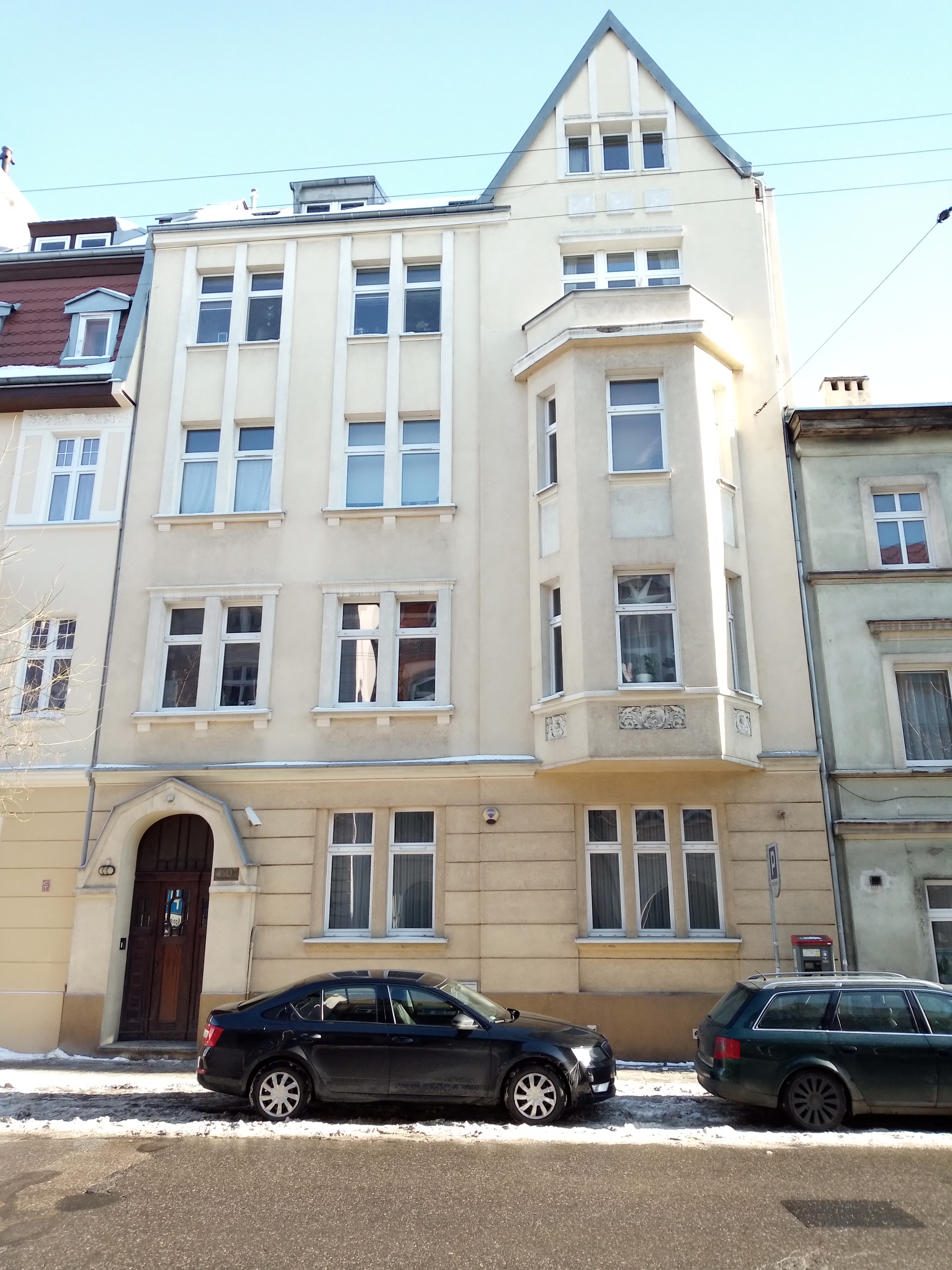
Tenement at 30 Sienkiewicza street (1911–1912)

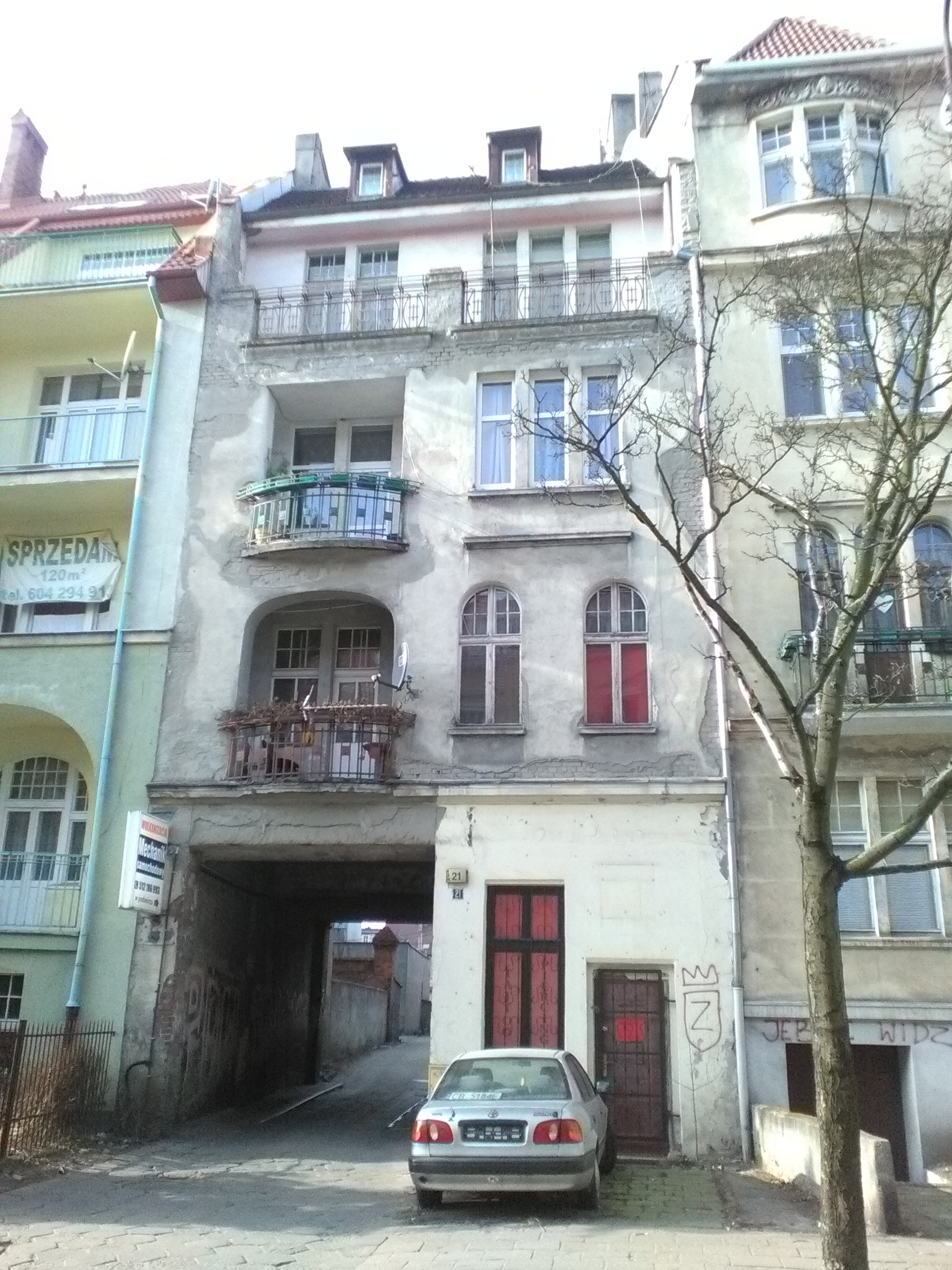
Tenement at 21 20 January 1920 street (1912)

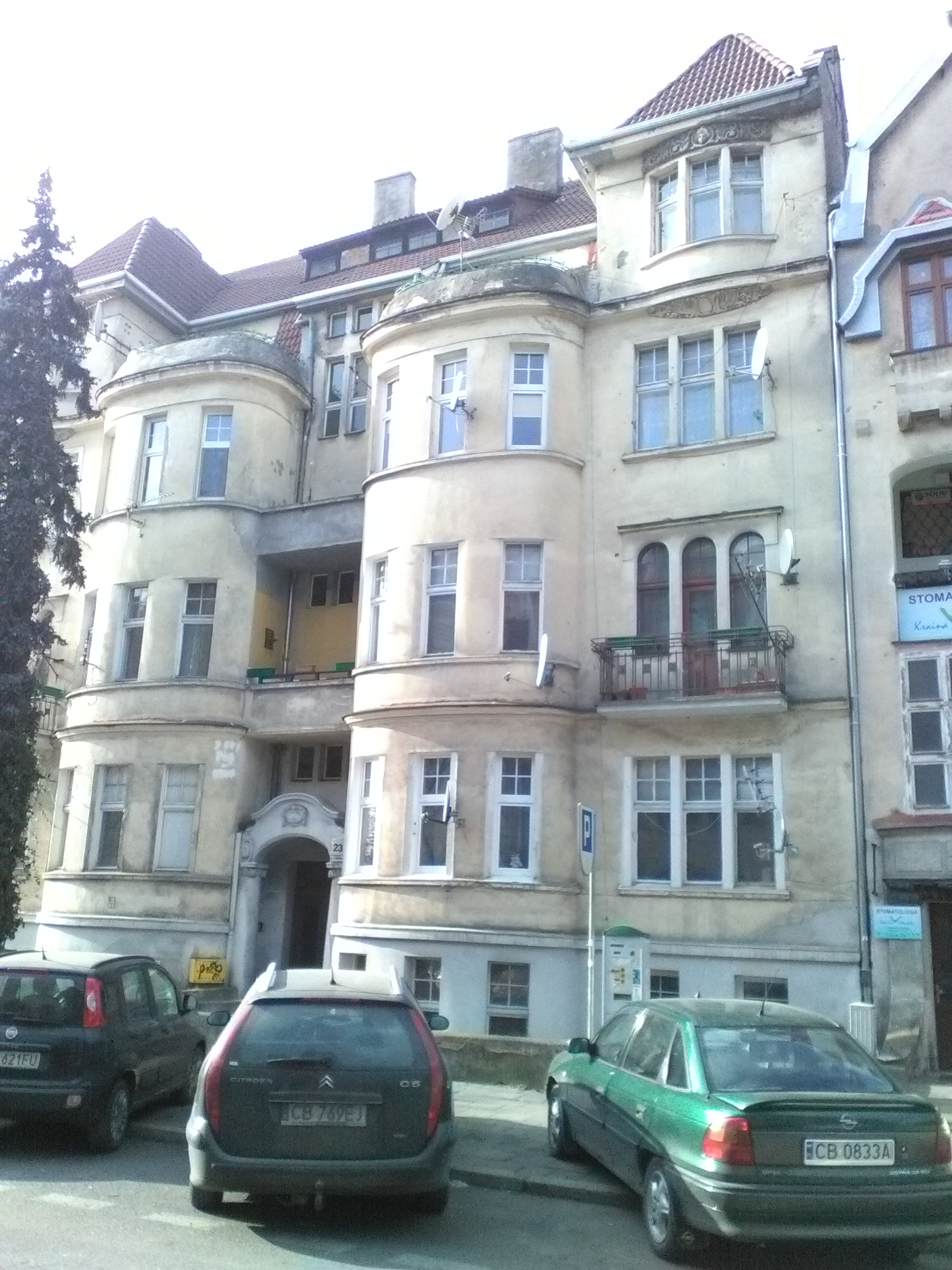
Art Nouveau tenement at 23 20 January 1920 street (1912)
Otto Walter
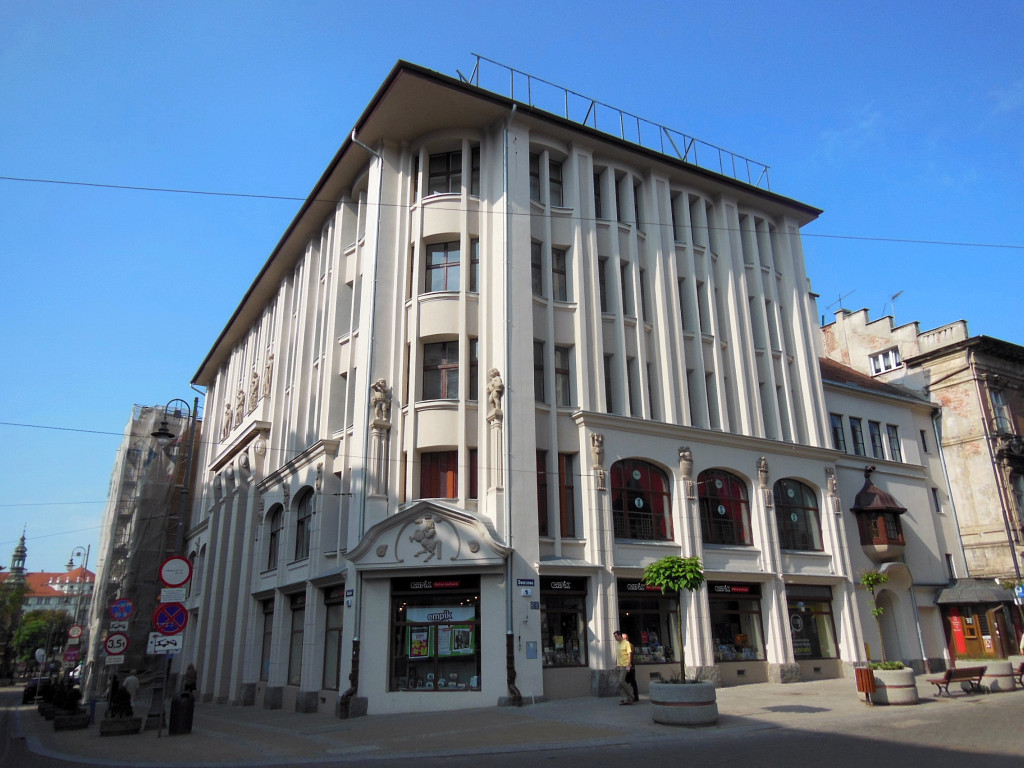
Department Store "Jedynak", at 15 Gdańska Street (1910–1911), registered on Kuyavian-Pomeranian Heritage list.

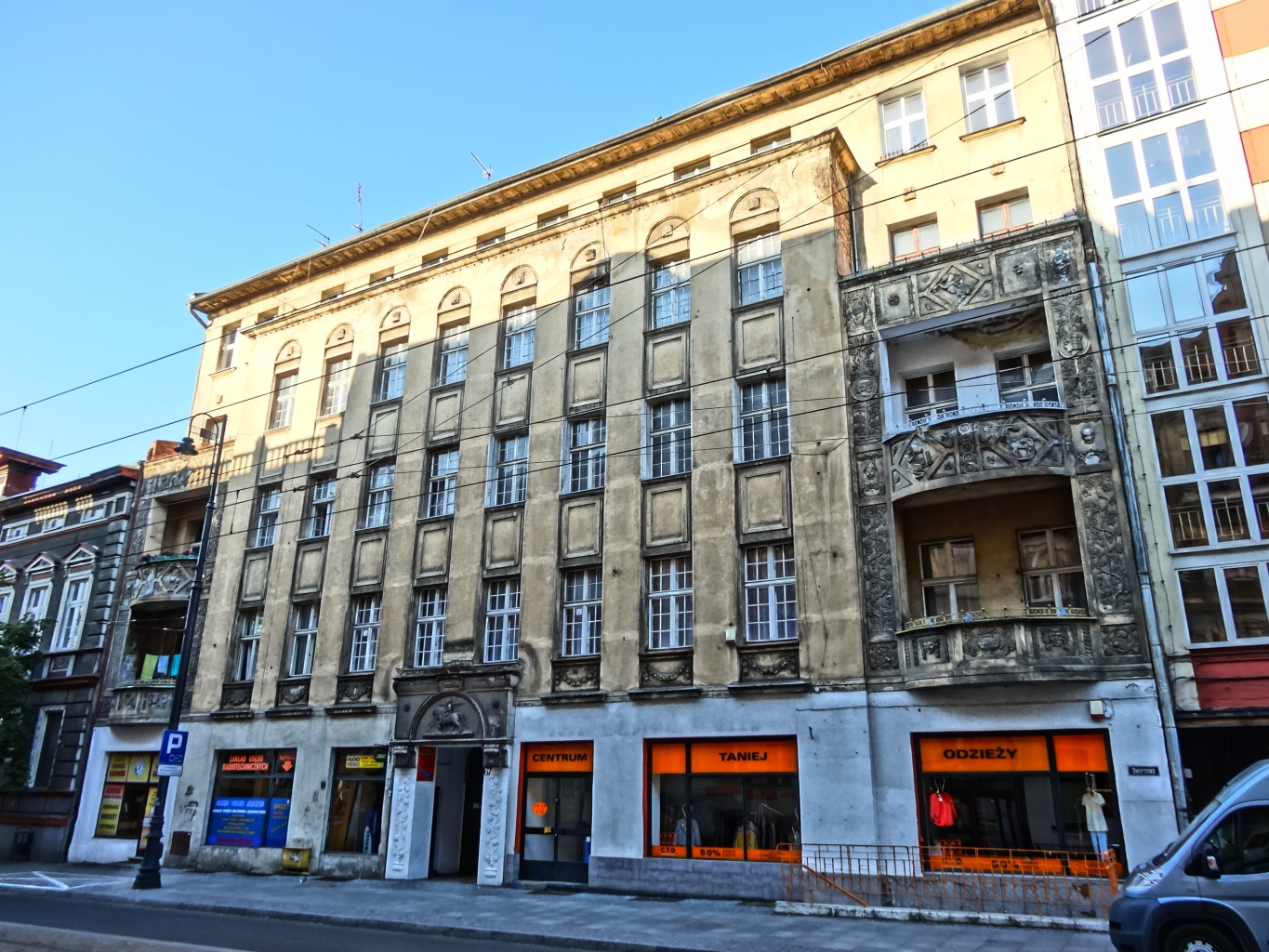
Erick Hecht tenement at 67 Dworcowa Street (1912–1913), registered on Kuyavian-Pomeranian Heritage list. Will be entirely restored in 2018.
Otto Müller
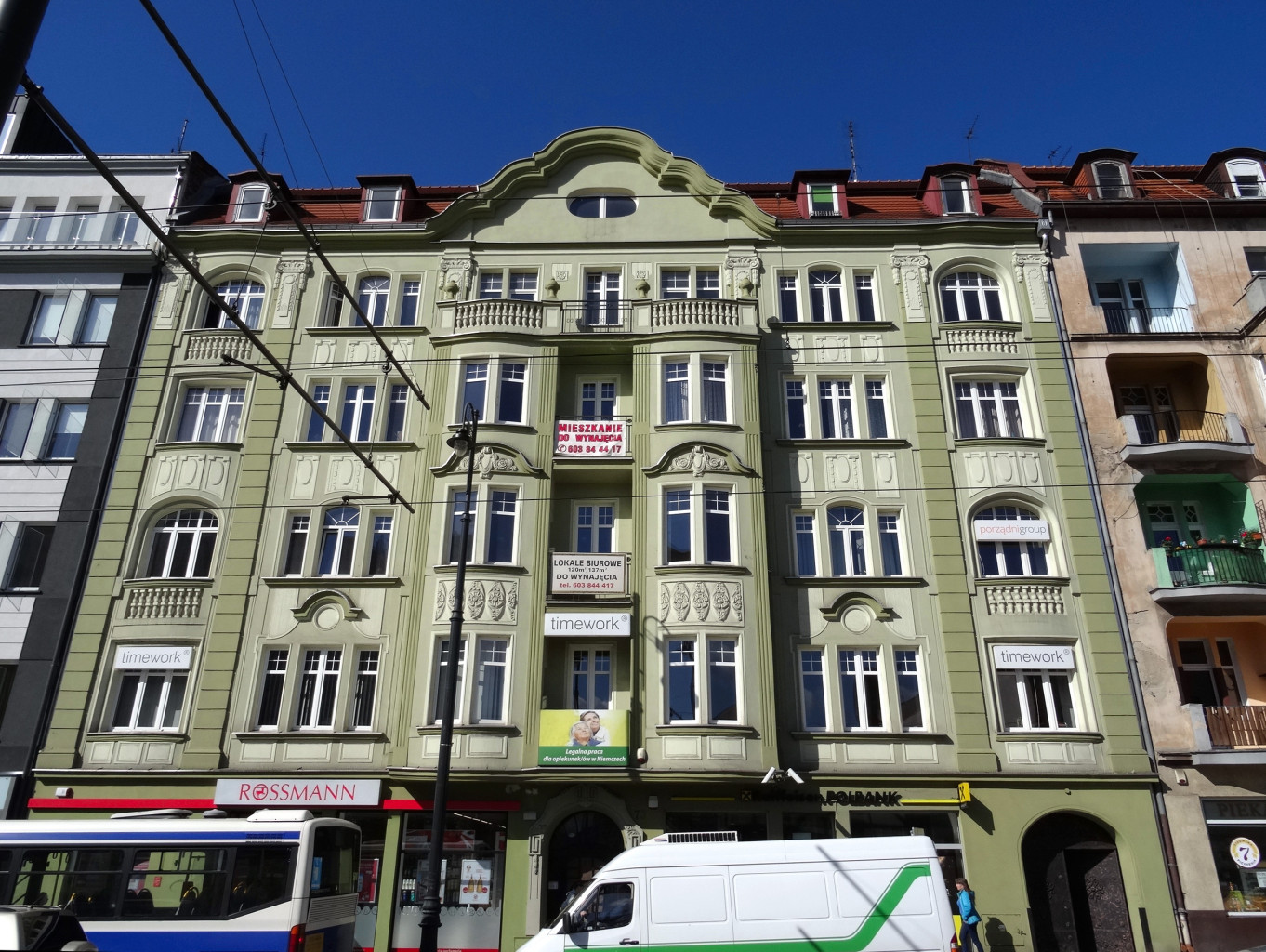
Fritz Herold tenement at 73 Dworcowa Street (1910–1912).

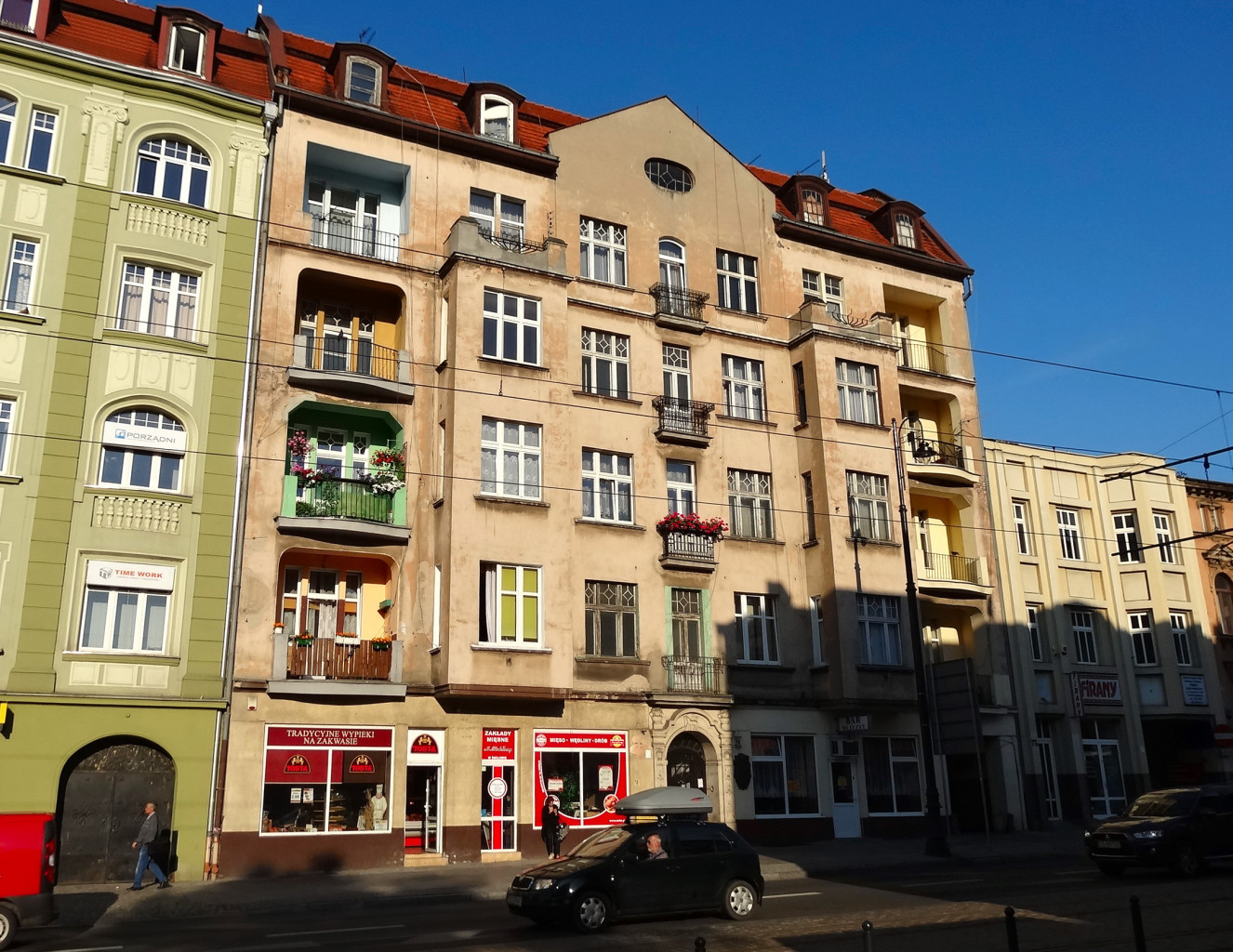
Tenement at 75 Dworcowa Street (1911–1912). Andrzej Schwalbe, the first director of Pomeranian Philharmonic from 1953 to 1991, lived there.

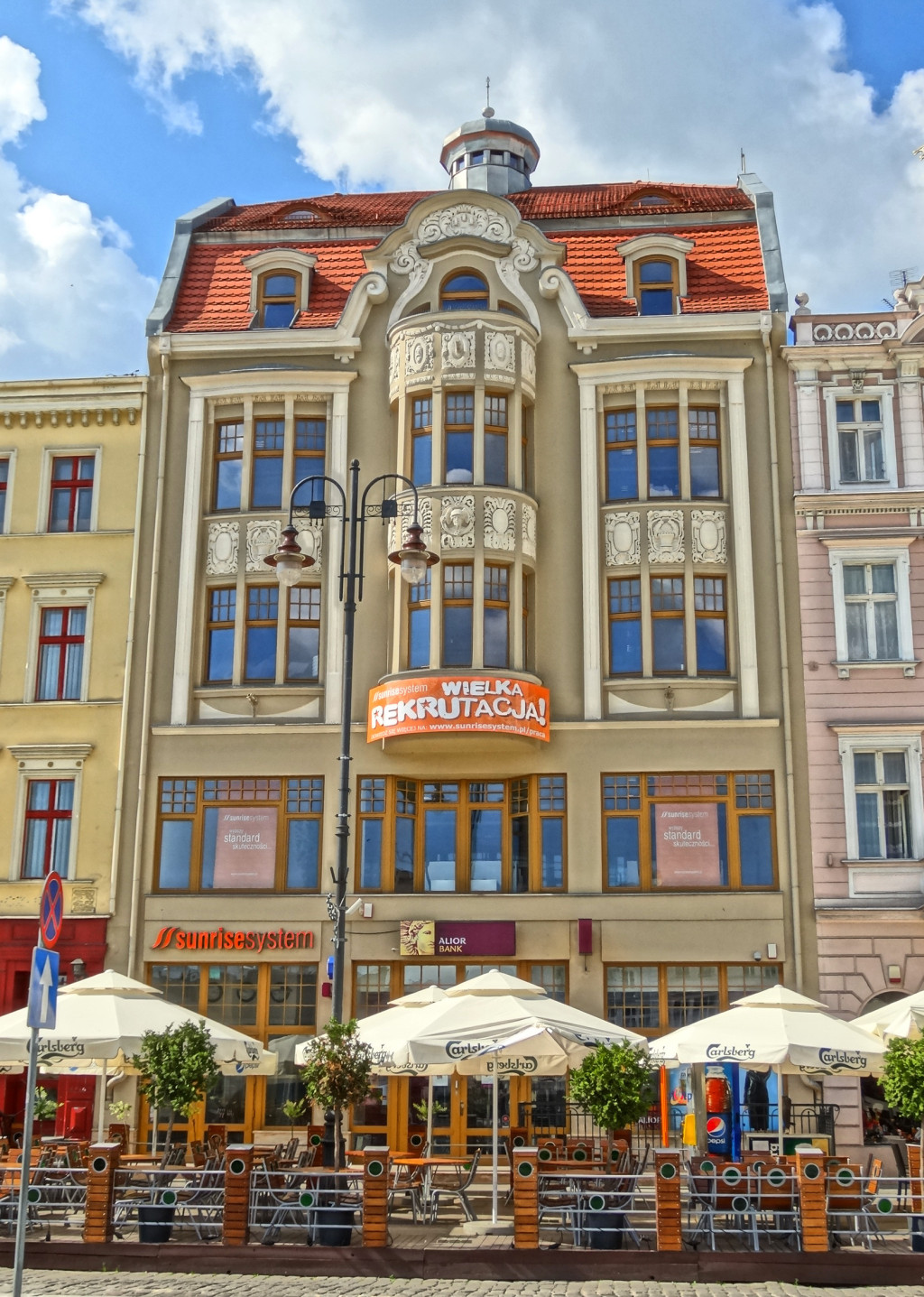
Former department store Siuchniński and Stobiecki at 20 Old Market square (1911).
Otto Brech
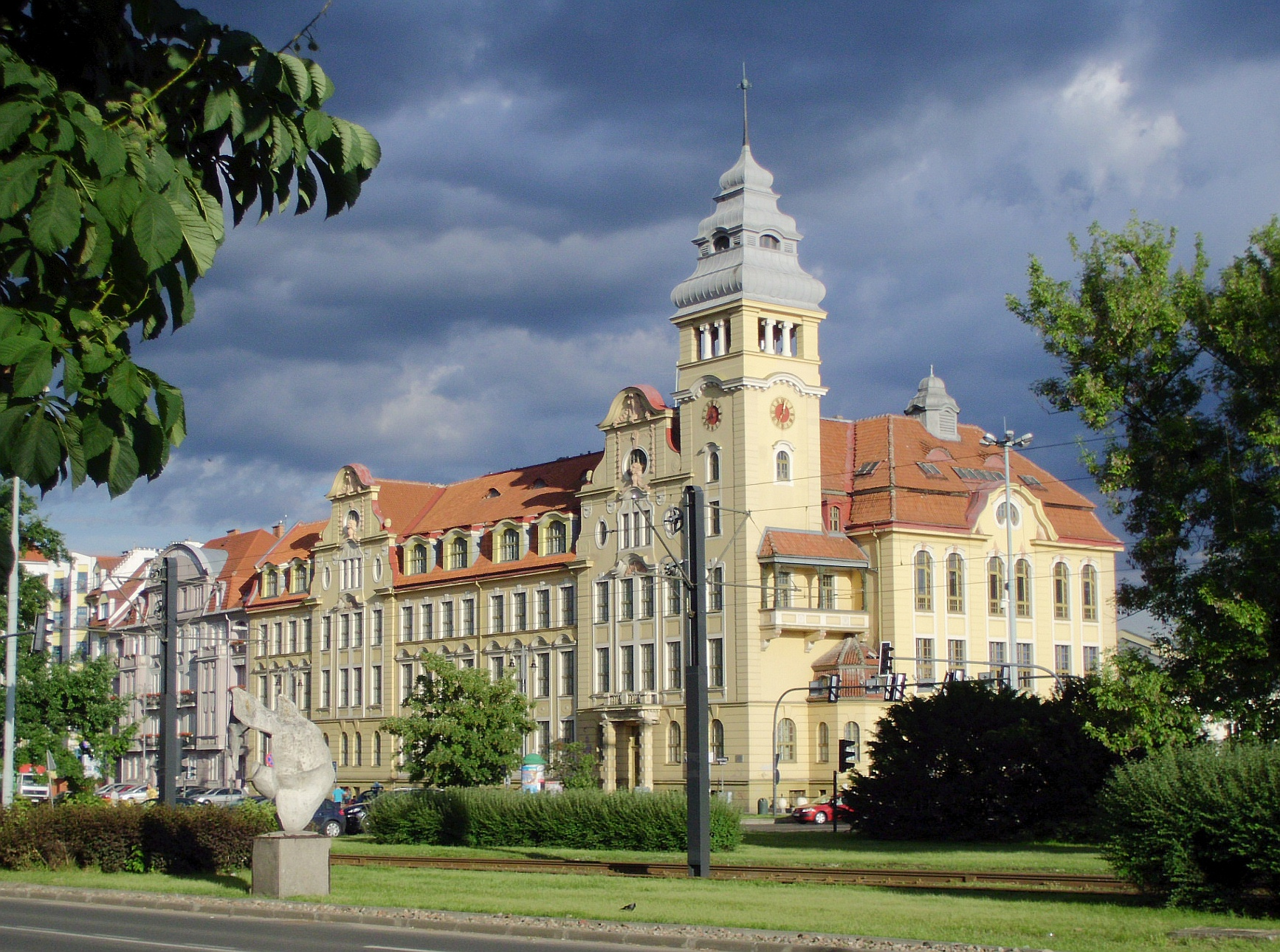
Mechanical School N°1, Bydgoszcz (1911) at 37 Świętej Trojcy street. Registered on Kuyavian-Pomeranian Heritage list.

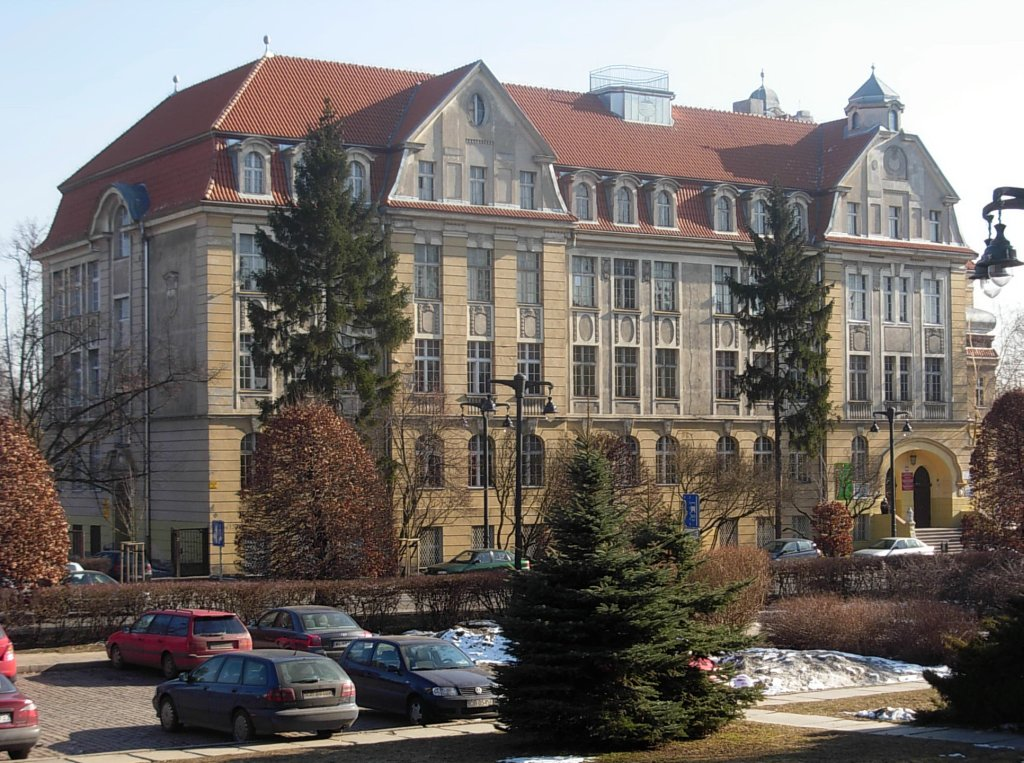
High School Nr.6 (1910) at 67 Staszica Street (1912–1913), registered on Kuyavian-Pomeranian Heritage list.

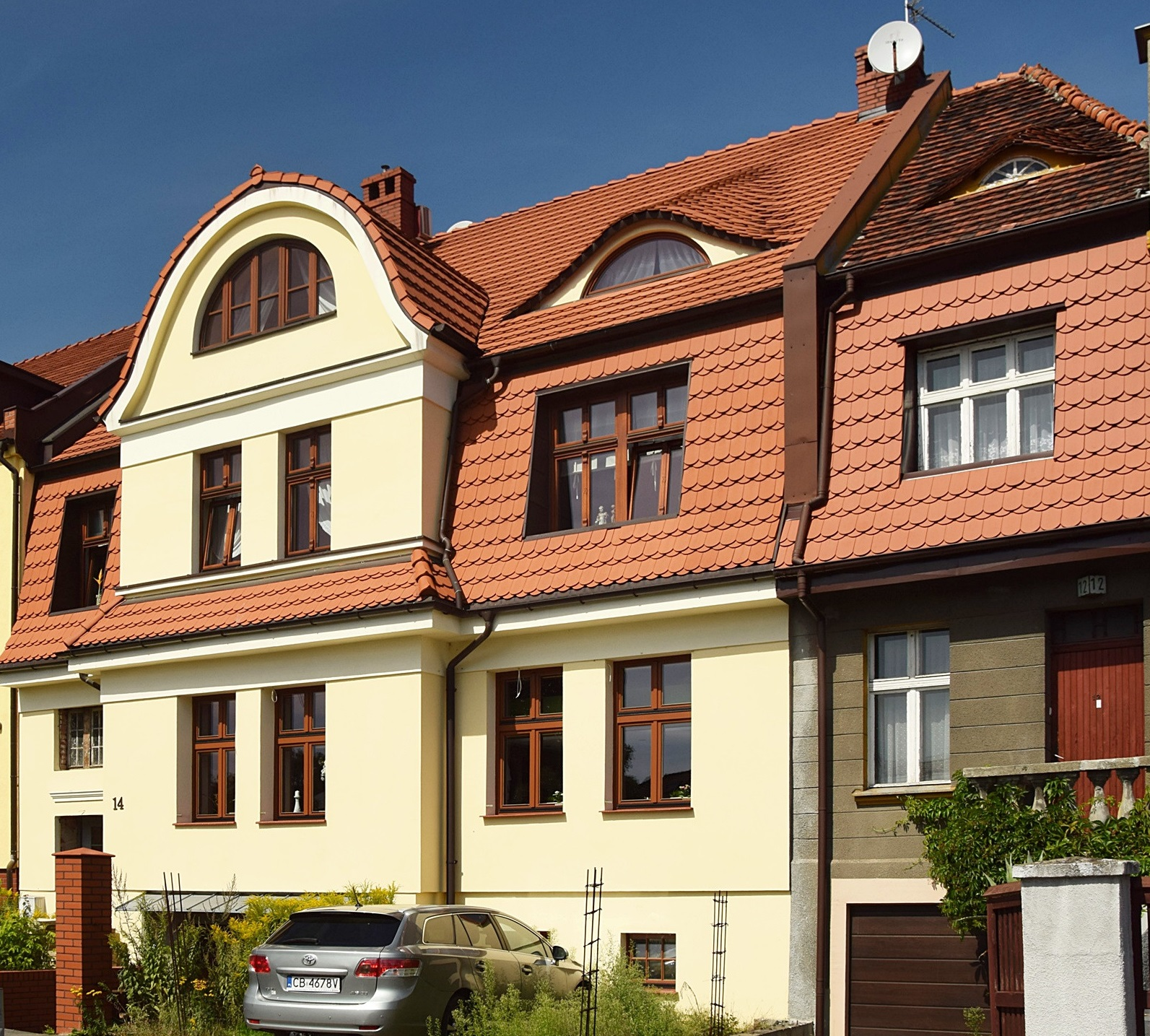
Villa at 14 Sielanka street (1914–1915)
Johannes Cornelius
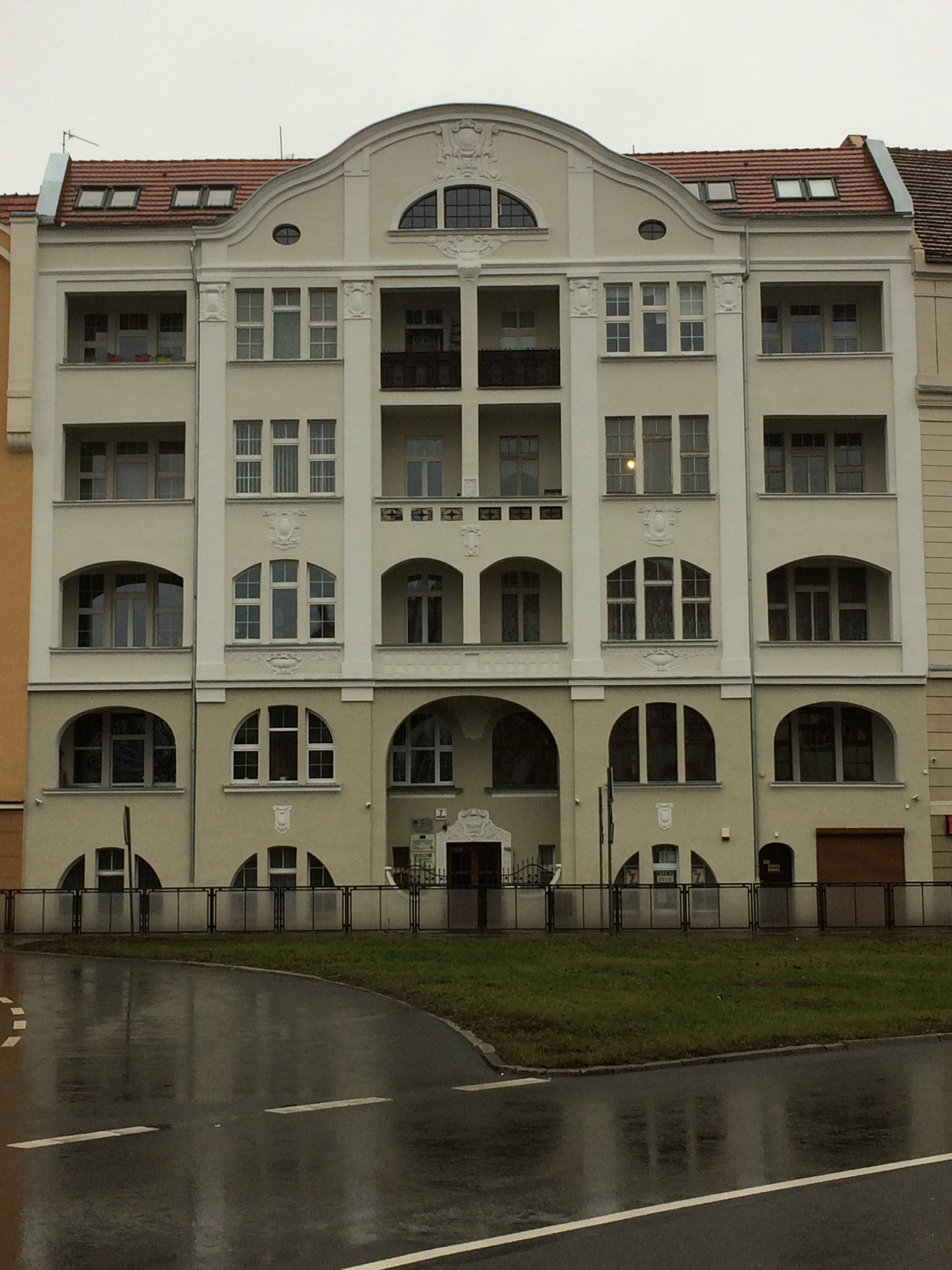
Tenement at 7 Józef Weyssenhoff Square (1909–1910), registered on Kuyavian-Pomeranian Heritage list

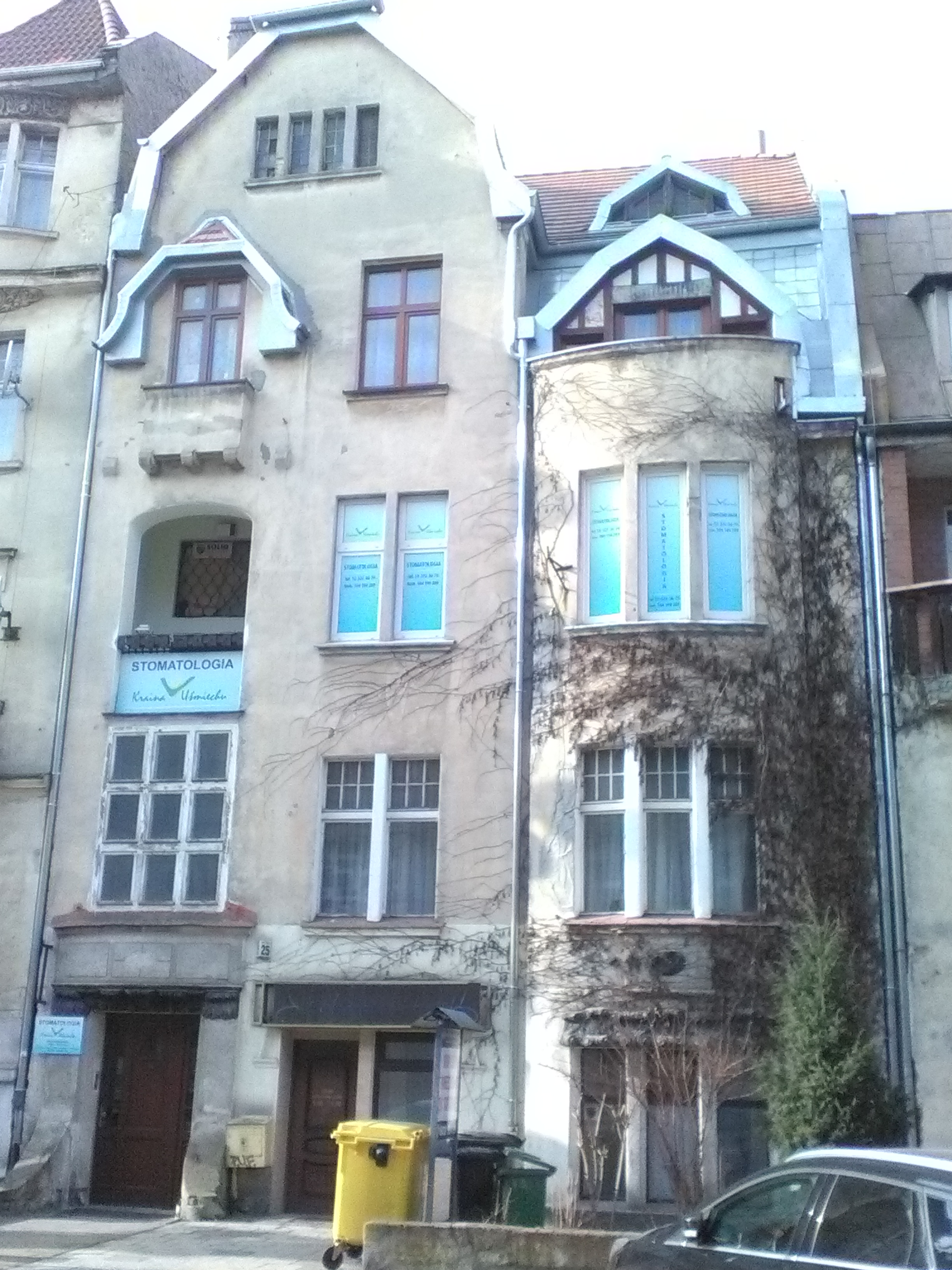
Tenement at 25 20 January 1920 street (1910)

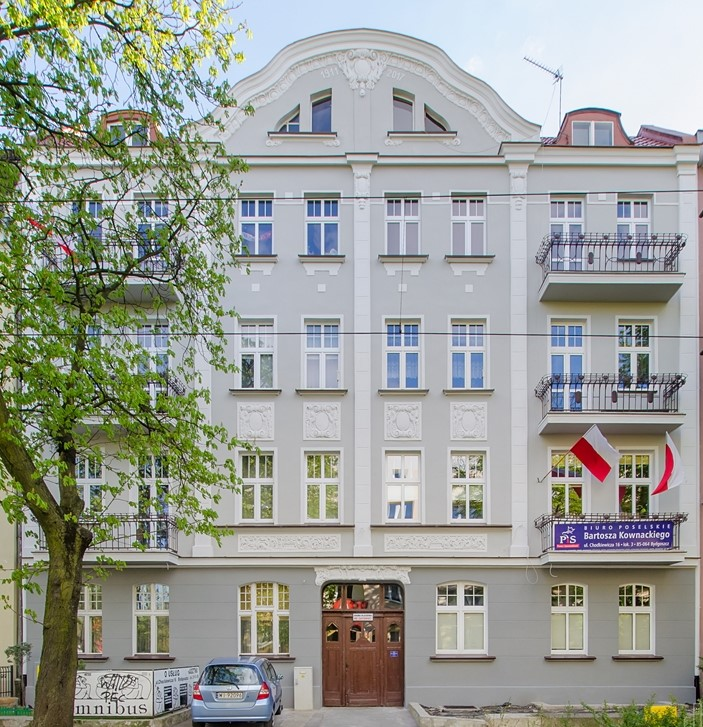
Located at 16 Chodkiewicza street (1910–1911), renovated in 2017.
Victor Pietrikowski
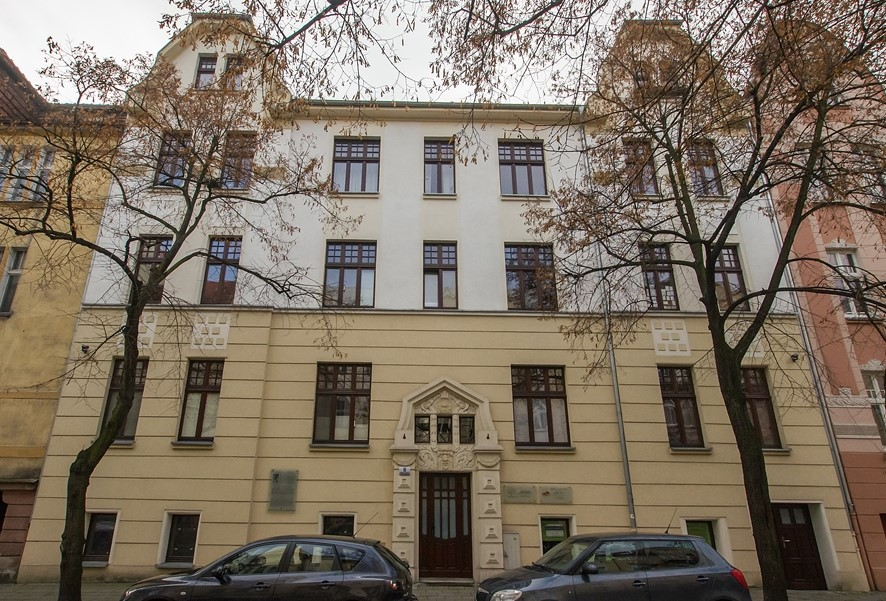
Tenement at 8 Zamoyskiego street (1908–1909). Building which belonged from 1920 to 1926 to Pola Negri, famous Polish movie star (1910s to 1930s).

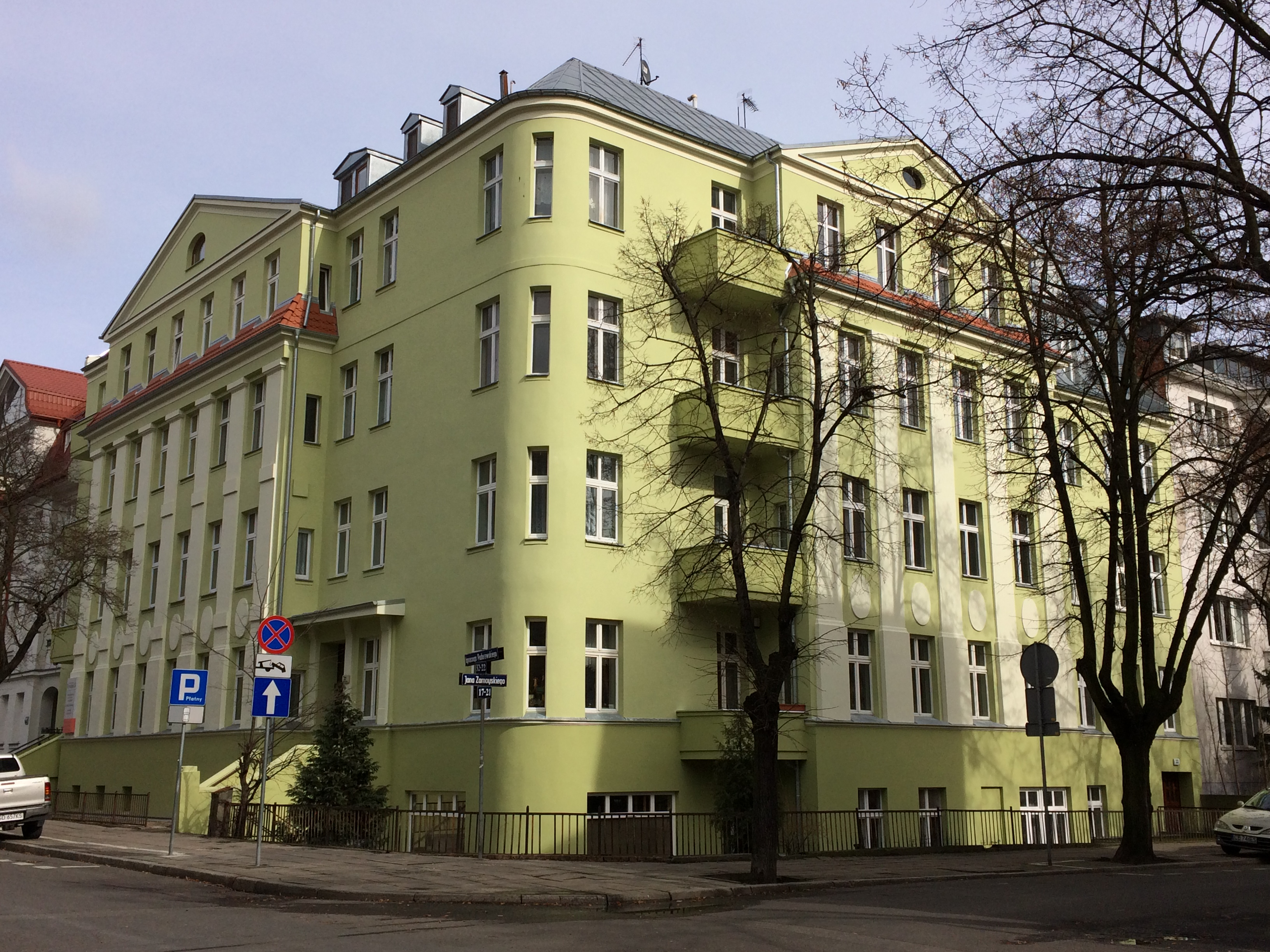
Tenement at 22 Paderewskiego Street (1912–1914), with early modernism features.

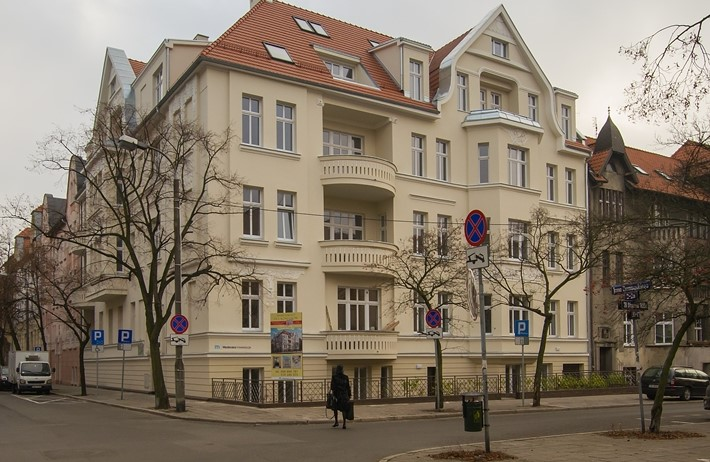
Located at 14 20 January 1920 street (1906–1907).

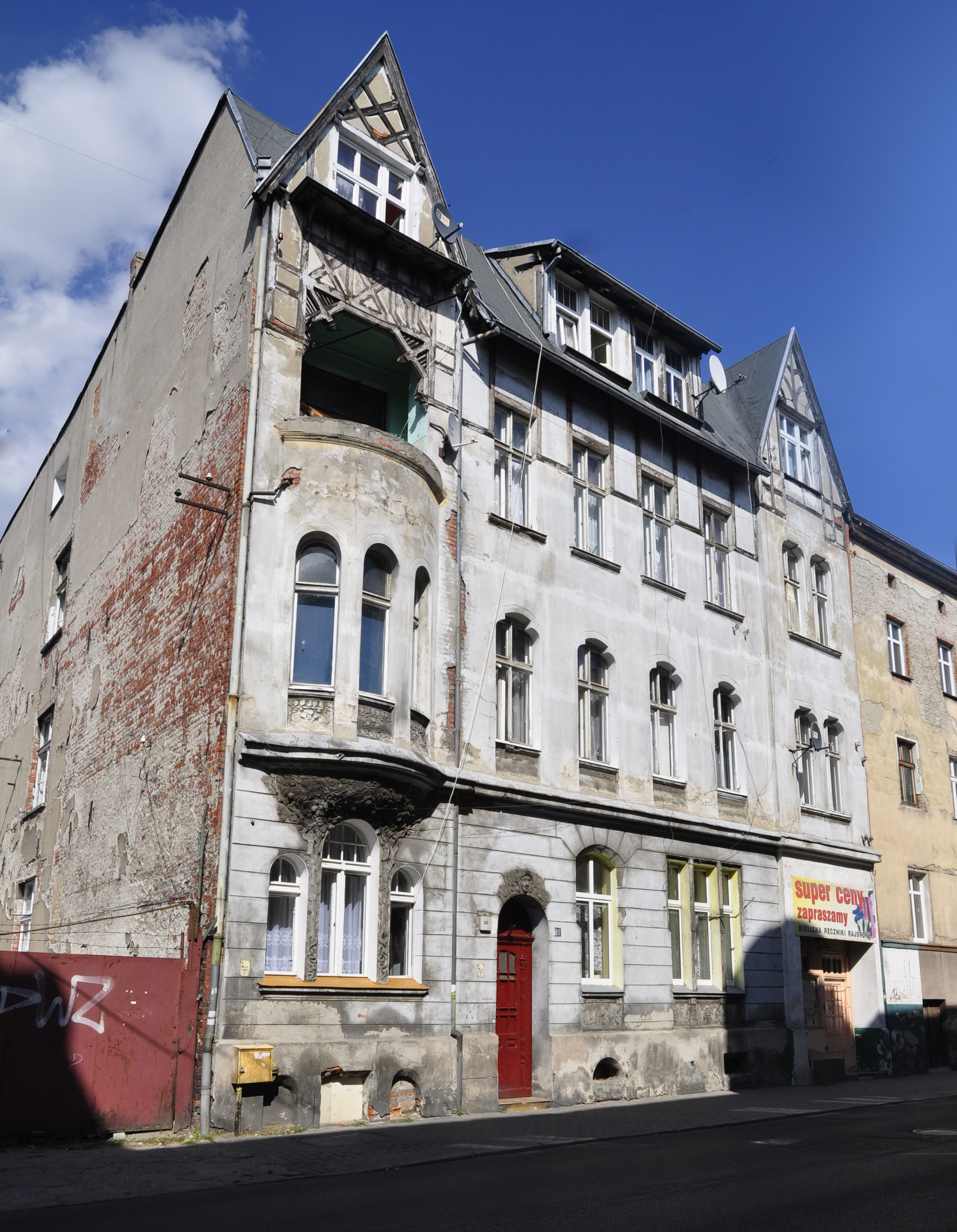
Tenement at 20 Garbary Street (1903–1904), registered on Kuyavian-Pomeranian Heritage list Nr.601294, A/823/1-2 (25 May 1994).

===== Other local architects from Prussian era =====
Name	Year	Building	Picture
A. Berndt	1850–1880	Two edifices are still visible on Theatre square: Nr.14 (1885) and 18 (1850–1875, picture).	
A. Hardt	1886	Tenement at 66 Dworcowa Street.	
Henrich Arndt	1894–1895	Tenement at 58 Gdańska Street.	
Fritz Müller	1872	Building at Krasiński 10.	
Albert Rose & Heinrich Mautz	1878	Building at Podwale Street, corner with Kręta street. Today, the house houses the Eljazz music club.	
Franz Julius Knüpfer & Carl Meyer	1901	Sanatorium in Smukała	
Ludwig Otto Wirpelius	1903–1904	Art Nouveau villa at Adam Mickiewicz Alley 11.	
H. Delius	1903–1906	Building of the Institute of Agriculture at 11 Józef Weyssenhoff Square, registered on Kuyavian-Pomeranian Voivodeship heritage list, Nr.601254-Reg.A/676/1-8, May 20, 1992.	
Carl Zaar & Rudolf Vahl	1905–1906	Prussian realschule, today it houses Bydgoszcz University's Institute of Mechanics and Applied Informatics at 1 Kopernika Street. Registered on Kuyavian-Pomeranian Voivodeship, Nr.601363, Reg.A/784, May 5, 1992.	
Goltz brothers	1906	Located at 14 Paderewskiego Street, one of its tenants in the 1930s was Józef Paderewski, brother of famous Ignacy Jan Paderewski.	
Emil and Georg Zillmann	1906–1907	Tenement located at 8 20 Stycznia 1920 Street, which initially housed Max Graeupner's clinic, specialized in Women's diseases and obstetrics (German: frauenkrankheiten und geburtshilfe).	
O.M.W. Müller	1910	Building at 11 Paderewskiego Street, corner with 10 Zamoyskiego street.	
Emil Heydemann	1910s	He realized two tenements, one at 21 Paderewskiego Street (1910), the other at 6 20 Stycznia 1920 Street (picture, 1911)	
Otto Brech & Carl Meyer	1911	Mechanical School N°1, Bydgoszcz, at 37 Świętej Trojcy street. Registered on Kuyavian-Pomeranian Voivodeship Heritage List, Nr.601424, Reg. A/890, March 23, 1993	
Alfred Mielke	1911	Tenement located at 20 20 Stycznia 1920 Street.	
Franz Julius Knüpfer	1912	Tenement at 2 Krasiński street, registered on Kuyavian-Pomeranian Voivodeship heritage list, Nr.601371-Reg.A/1090, December 15, 1993	
Roger Sławski	1912	Church of the Holy Trinity in Bydgoszcz at 26 Świętej Trojcy street. Registered on Kuyavian-Pomeranian Voivodeship Heritage List, Nr.601222 Reg.A/752, September 20, 1971	
Oskar Hoßfeld	1913	Church of the Sacred Heart of Jesus in Bydgoszcz at 5 Piastowski Square. Registered on Kuyavian-Pomeranian Voivodeship Heritage List, Nr.601221, Reg.A/746, December 12, 1971.	
Heinrich Gross	1913	Building at 6 Theatre square in Bydgoszcz, corner with Jagiellońska street.	
Johann Petrikowski	1913–1915	Villa at 24 Paderewskiego Street: it was the house of the architect Johann Petrikowski.	

== Polish Period (1918-1970s) ==
=== Bogdan Raczkowski ===
Bogdan Raczkowski was born on March 12, 1888, in Poznań. In March 1921, he moved to Bydgoszcz, where on 29 December, he took the post of city councilor, head of the Ground Construction Office. He served as deputy chairman of the city council for many years.

During his mandate as a counselor, several Bydgoszcz districts have been enriched by a number of residential complexes financed by city magistrates: Babia Wieś, Biedaszkowo, Bielawy, Jachcice and Śródmieście (downtown). Many renovations were made and the aesthetics of the city improved. Raczkowski planned and co-designed the construction of a 600-bed city hospital.

After Invasion of Poland in September 1939, his home at 1 Asnyka street being already occupied by a German dignitary, the family lived with a relative at Weyssenhoff Square. On October 2, 1939, they were all arrested and shot probably in the forest north of the city (Las Gdański), on October 4. Only Raczkowski's son Zdzisław escaped the arrest and survived WWII.

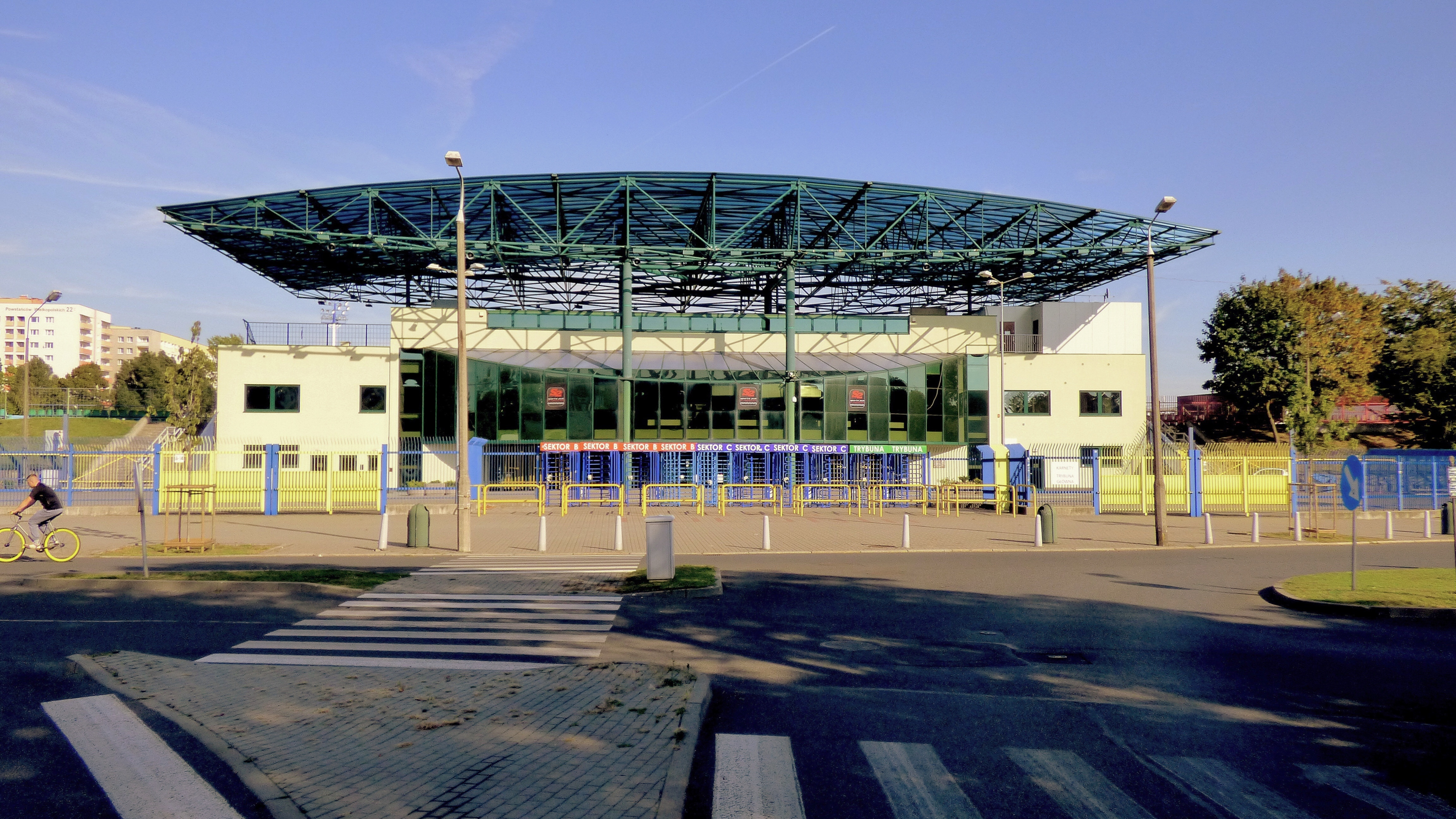
Polonia Stadium (1922)

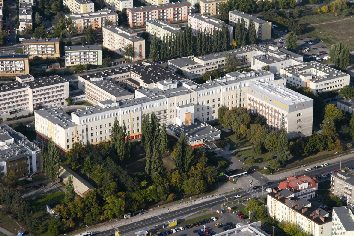
View of Jurasz hospital, initial design by Bogdan Raczkowski

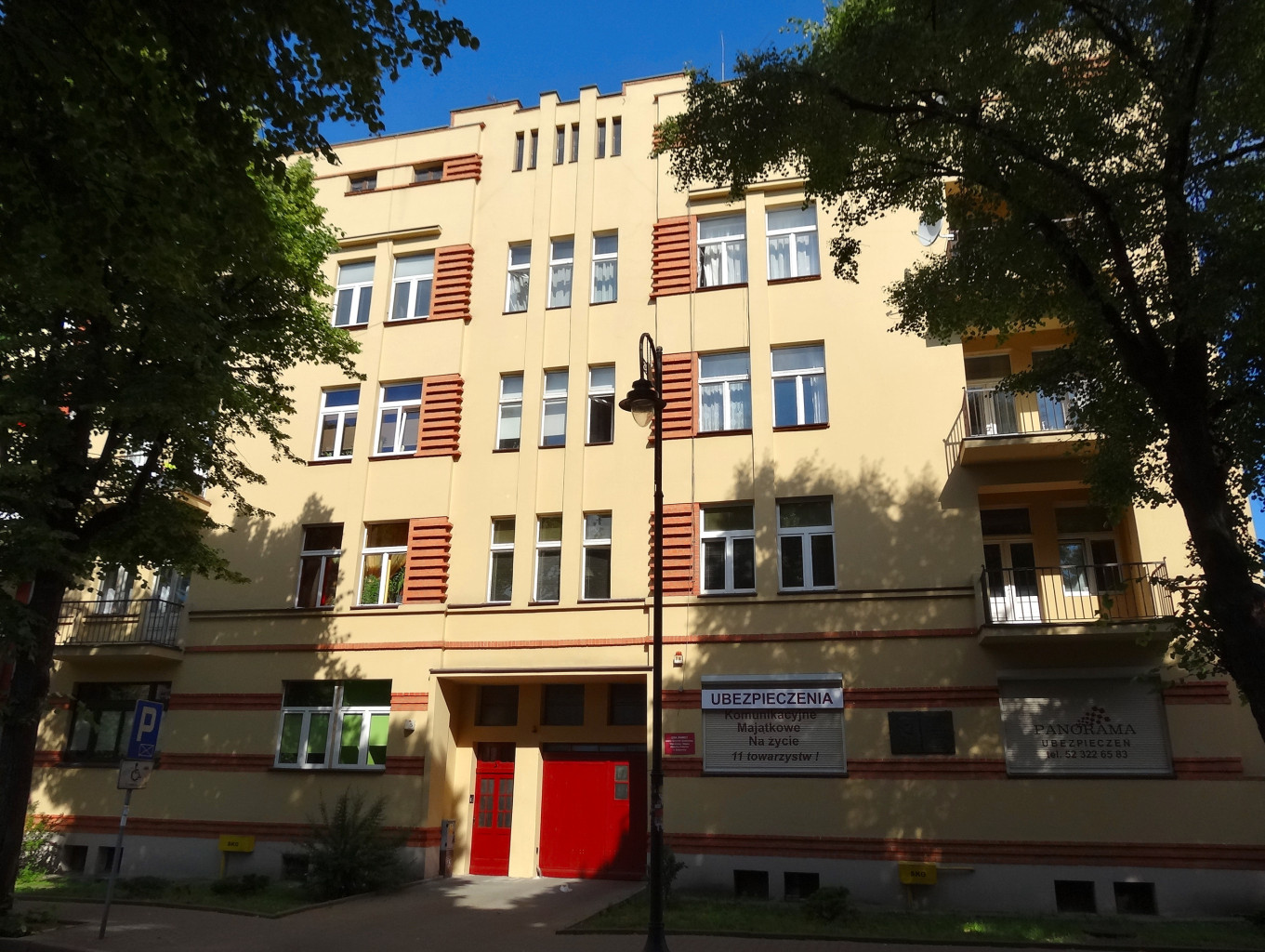
Building at 5 Libelta street (1928–1929)

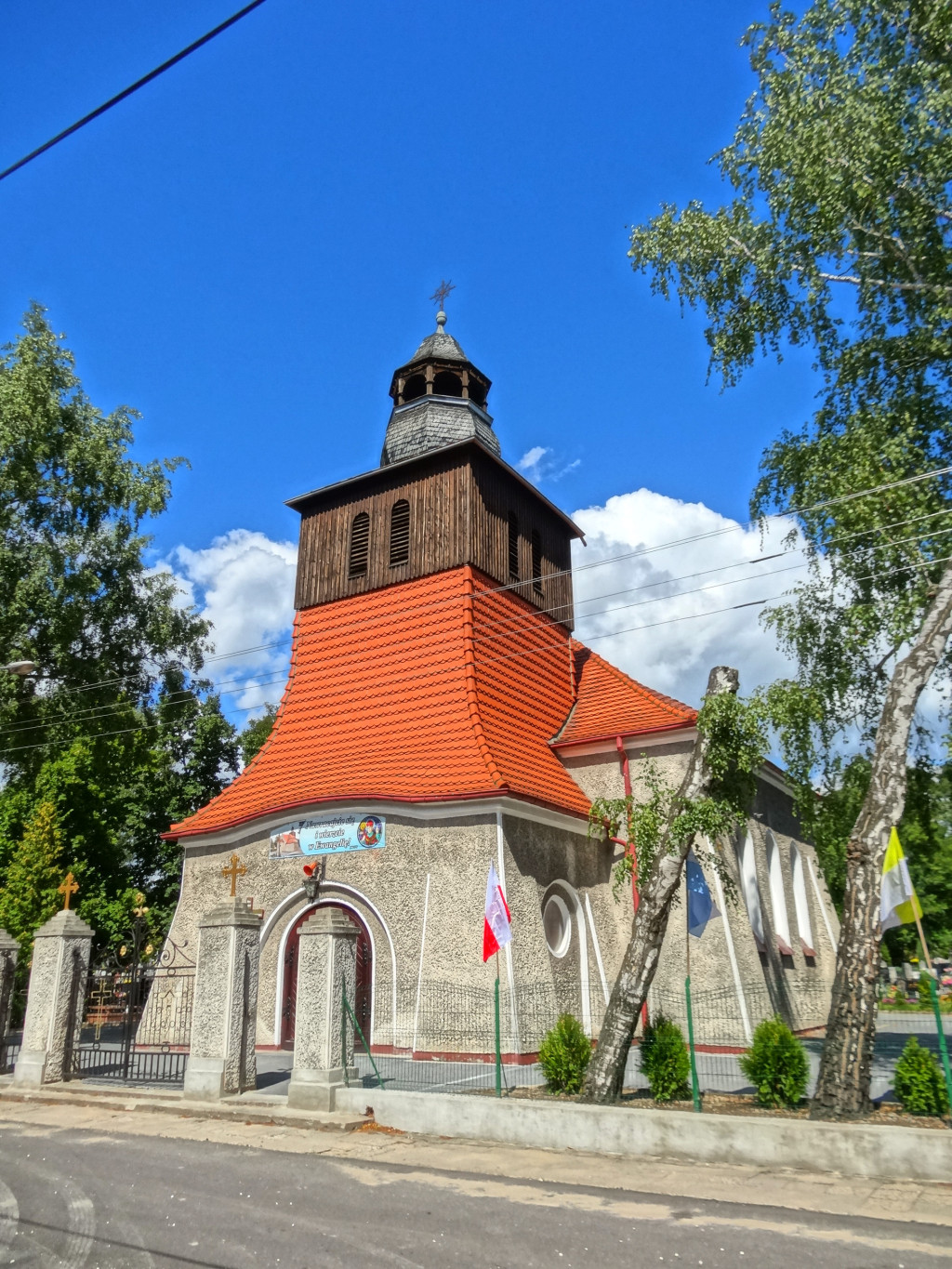
St. Stanislaus of Szczepanów church in Bydgoszcz

=== Jan Kossowski ===
Jan Kossowski (July 13, 1898, in Belarus-December 9, 1958, in Bydgoszcz) was a very prolific Polish architect and builder, mainly associated with Bydgoszcz. His professional activity stretches from the interwar period to the 1940s.

The best villas designed by Kossowski were erected in the Sielanka and Leśne districts and in Sułkowskiego Street. Not only did he design houses, but also performed reconstruction of public, industrial buildings and sacral buildings. He is as well the author of the Freedom Monument in downtown Bydgoszcz.

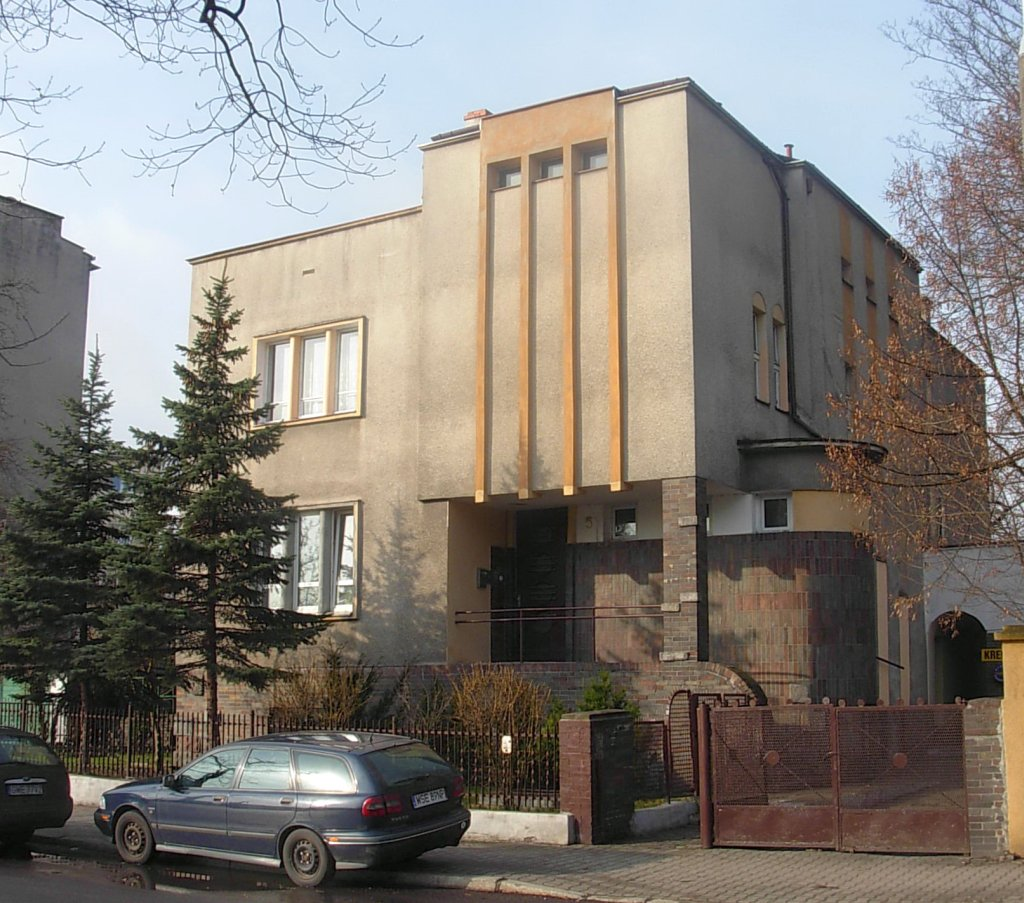
Villa at Ossoliński Alley 5

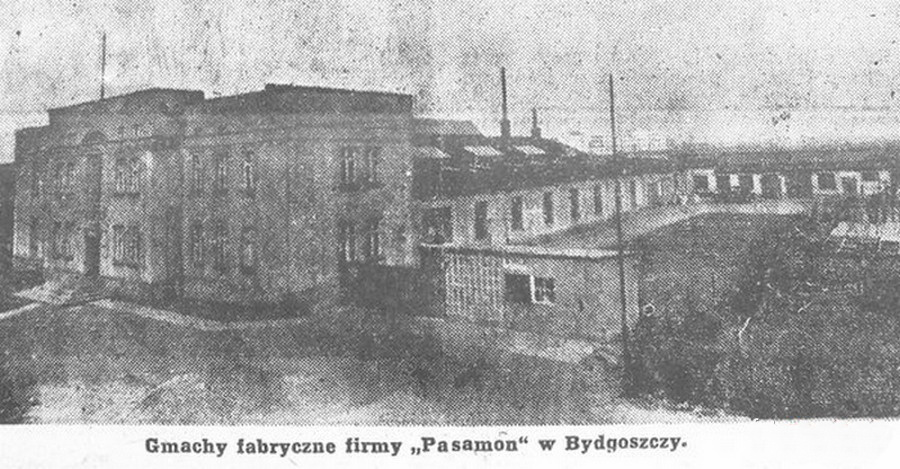
Pasamon complex at 117 Jagiellońska street in Bydgoszcz

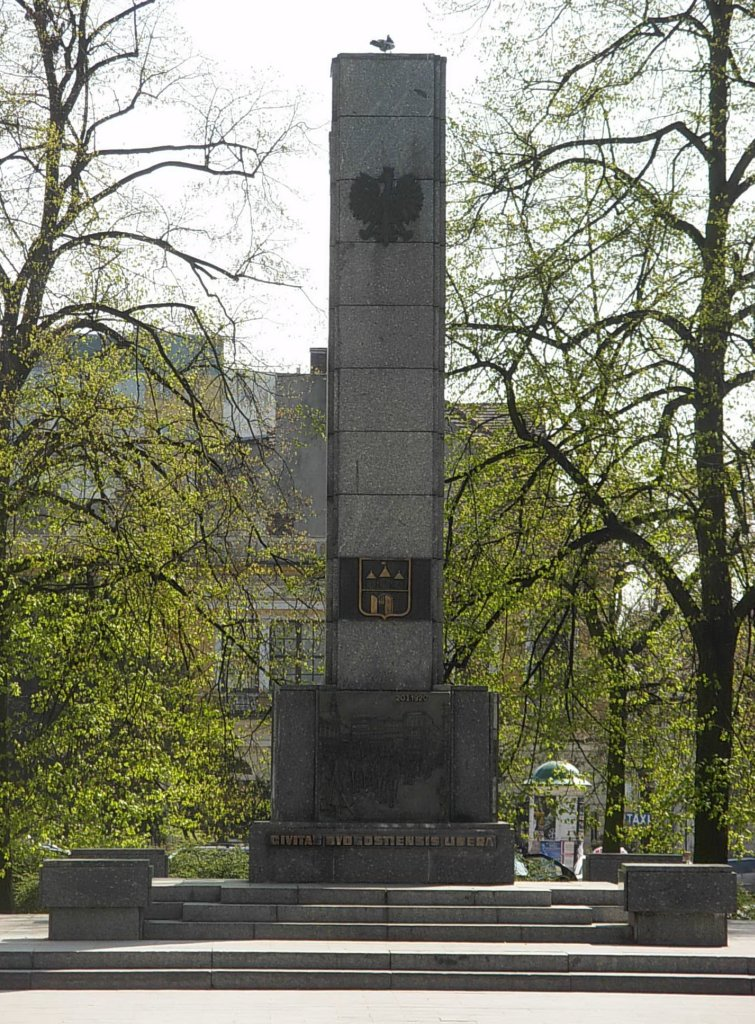
Freedom Monument

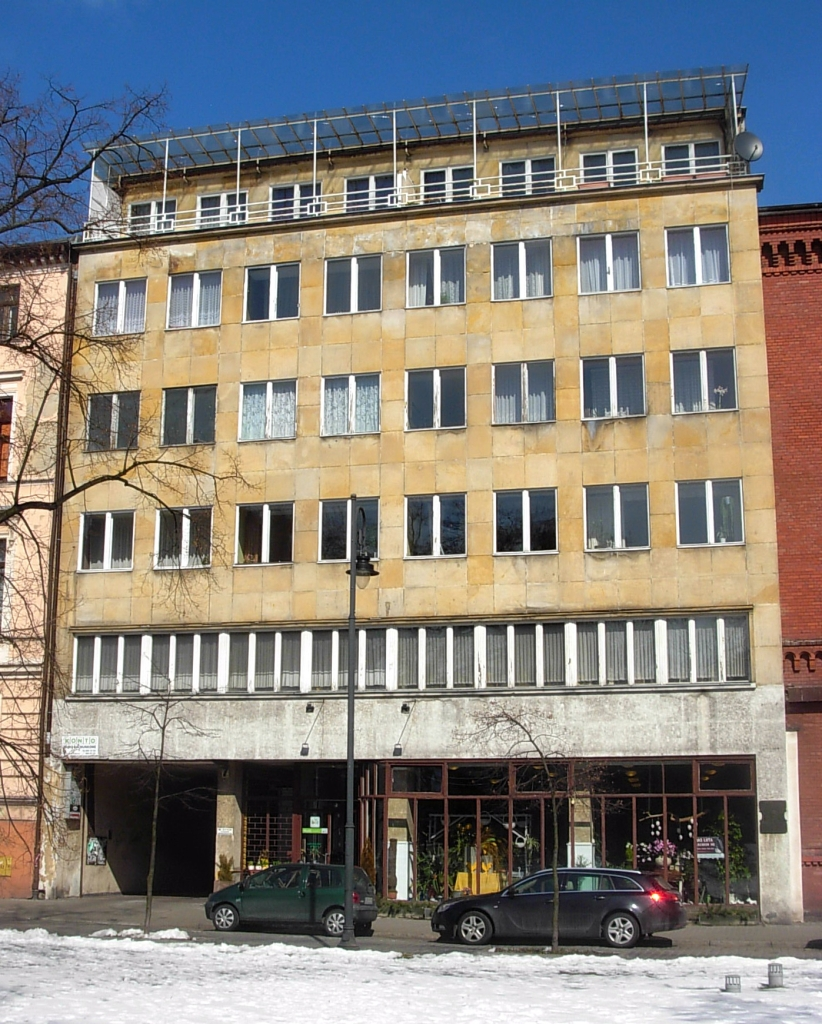
Tenement at 7 Plac Wolnosci

=== Alfons Licznerski ===
Alfons Licznerski was born on September 25, 1902, in the village of Sampława then part of East Prussia. He was the son of Józef, a farmer, also Schultheiß of the village. His parents moved to Rożental in 1906, and Alfons attended elementary and primary schools there from 1908 to 1915. In the autumn of 1915, he began his studies in the pre-gymnasium in Lubawa. There, he became interested in socio-national issues and in 1917, he joined the activist movement of the Society of Tomasz Zan. During the meetings of the society, he learned Polish history and literature.

In 1919, he was a member of the forbidden Polish Scouting movement, and from 1920, he was in the first junior high school scouting team. He then attended a classical gymnasium in 1921 in Toruń and after graduation in 1924, he was appointed for military service in Grudziądz. However, after an accident, he was permanently released from the army.

From 1925 to 1933, Alfons Licznerski studied at the Faculty of Architecture of the Gdańsk University of Technology, obtaining in March 1934 the diploma of Civil engineer. During his studies he participated in corporation trips in Pomerelia and Kashubia cities.

During his studies he took longer professional practices in firms and construction offices in Gdynia and Gdańsk (1928–1933). As such he participated, among others, in the building of:

- the Władysławowo railway station (1928);
- a port warehouse and storage facility (Gdynia, 1929–1932);
- a residential worker colony (Gdynia, 1932–1933).

After graduating, he designed the municipal slaughterhouse in Płock (1934–1935), or the expansion of the gymnasium in Gdańsk (1935–1936). He also traveled to gain professional expertise, in Poland and abroad (e.g. Germany), studying urban issues and problems of industrial construction.

In September 1936, he settled in Bydgoszcz, where he worked in the Construction Department of the Municipal Board until the outbreak of World War II. During Occupation of Poland (1939–1945), he kept his position at the Technical Department of the city. At the end of February 1944, he was drafted into the Wehrmacht.

He returned to Bydgoszcz in November 1945 and started working at the Regional Directorate of Spatial Planning, where he was the head of the urban studio (1945–1948). In 1947, at the request of the Theater Reconstruction Committee, he designed a new theater building (today's Polish Theatre in Bydgoszcz). Alfons Licznerski initiated the systematic collection of photographs of Bydgoszcz monuments. After many years in the municipal and regional construction boards and offices, he retired in 1968.

In 1971, was awarded the title of Honorary Member of the Association of the Supporters of Bydgoszcz (Polish: Towarzystwo Miłośników Miasta Bydgoszczy, TMMB). He died on June 8, 1976, in Bydgoszcz and was buried in the Nowofarny Cemetery in Bydgoszcz.

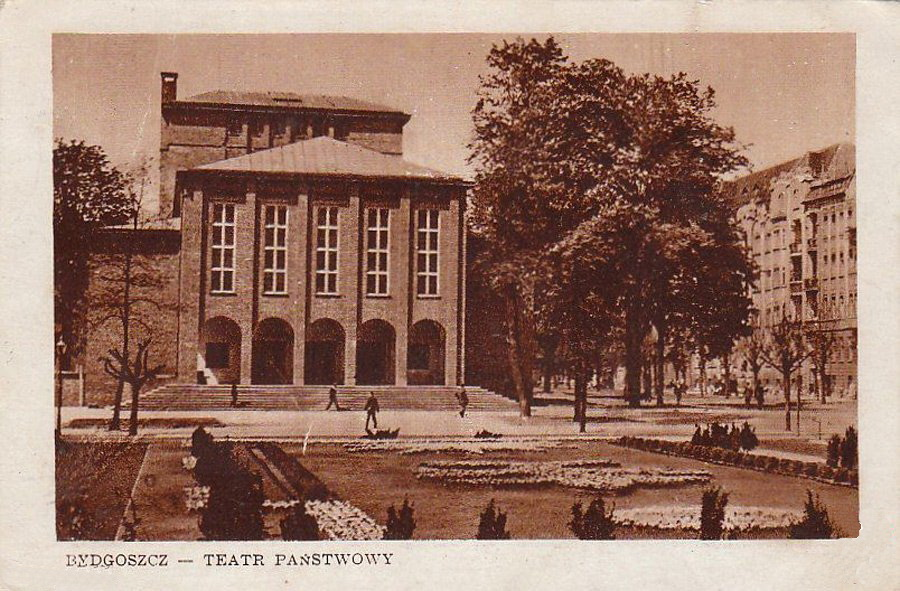
Polish Theatre in Bydgoszcz ca 1950

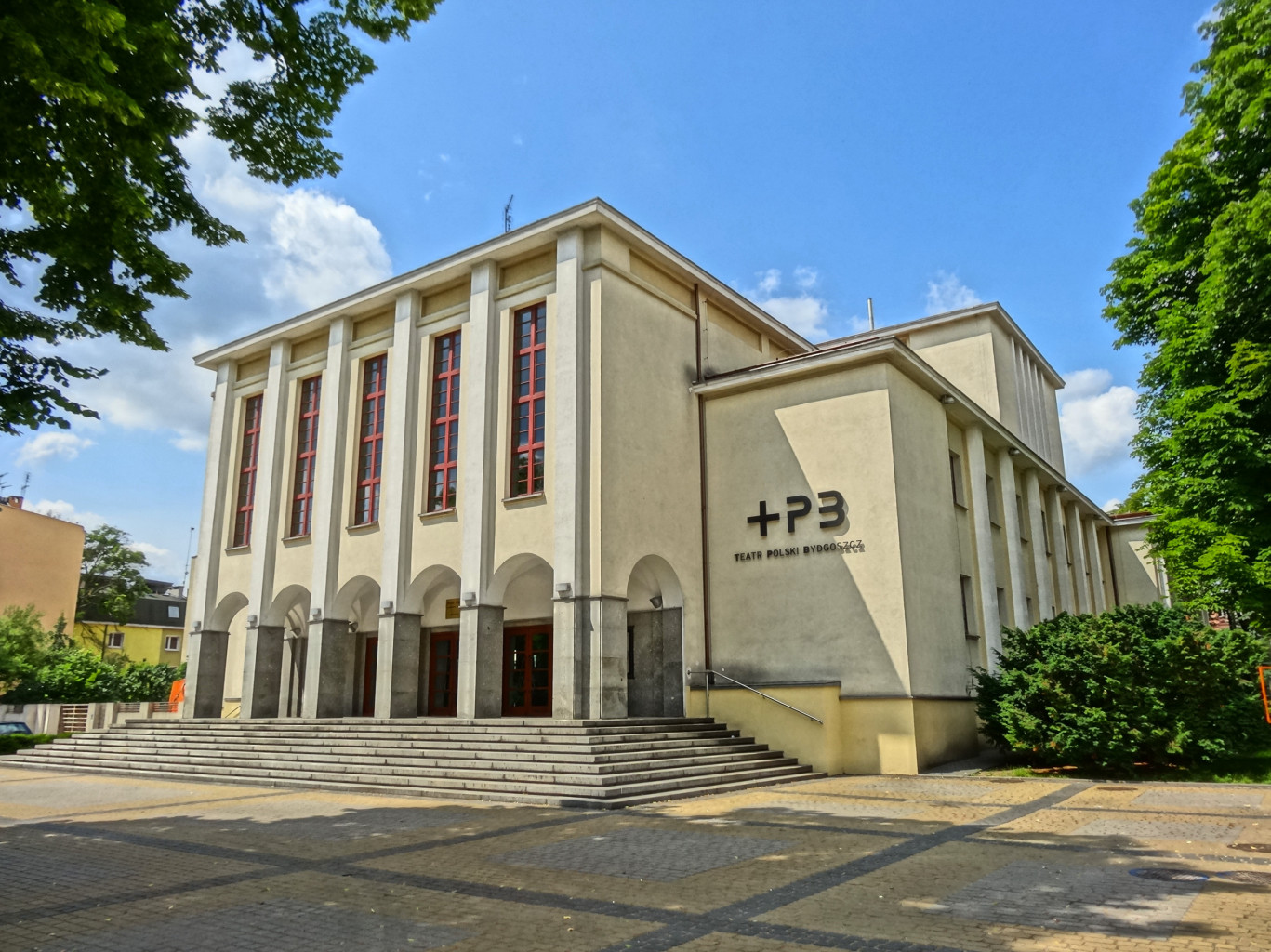
The building today

=== Stefan Klajbor ===
Stefan Klajbor was born on October 20, 1924, in Bydgoszcz. After WWII, he joined the Presidium of Bydgoszcz National Council and was the main architect of the city until 1958. He had a continuous active production till December 1989, when he retired. He died in Bydgoszcz in 1991.

His most important achievements in Bydgoszcz include the designs of (among others):

- the Pomeranian Philharmonic building (1959);
- the building of Bydgoszcz Polish Federation of Engineering Associations (Polish: Naczelna Organizacja Techniczna, NOT);
- the project of Recreation and Culture Forest Park (Polish: Leśny Park Kultury i Wypoczynku) in Myślęcinek district.
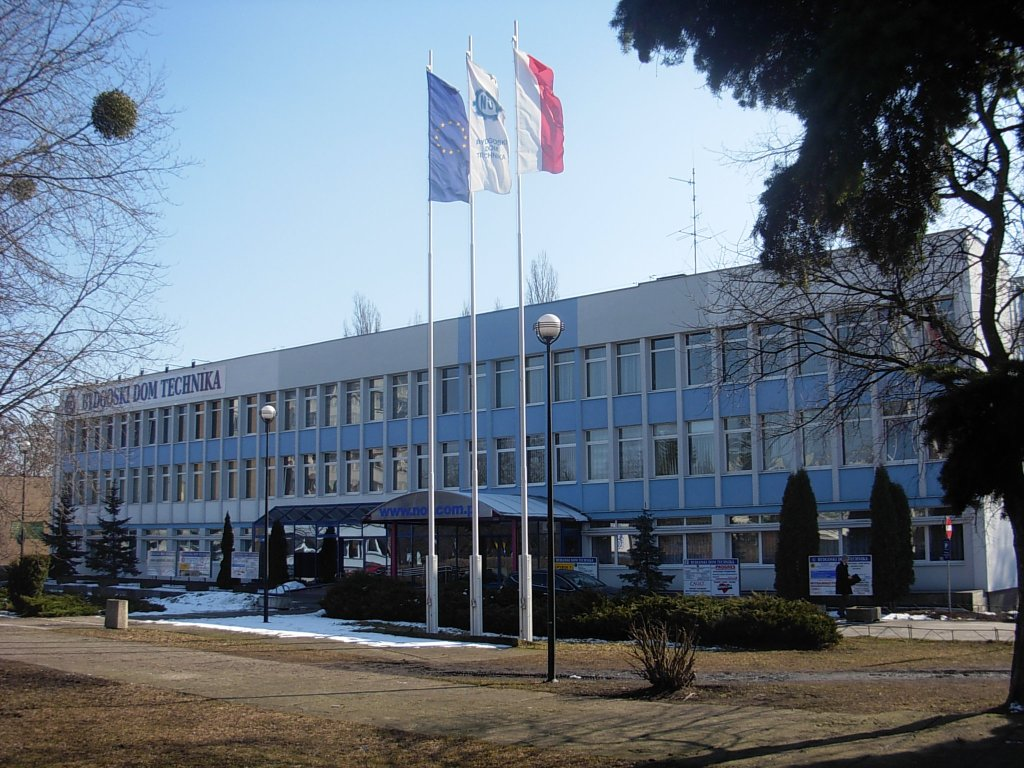
Bydgoszcz NOT building

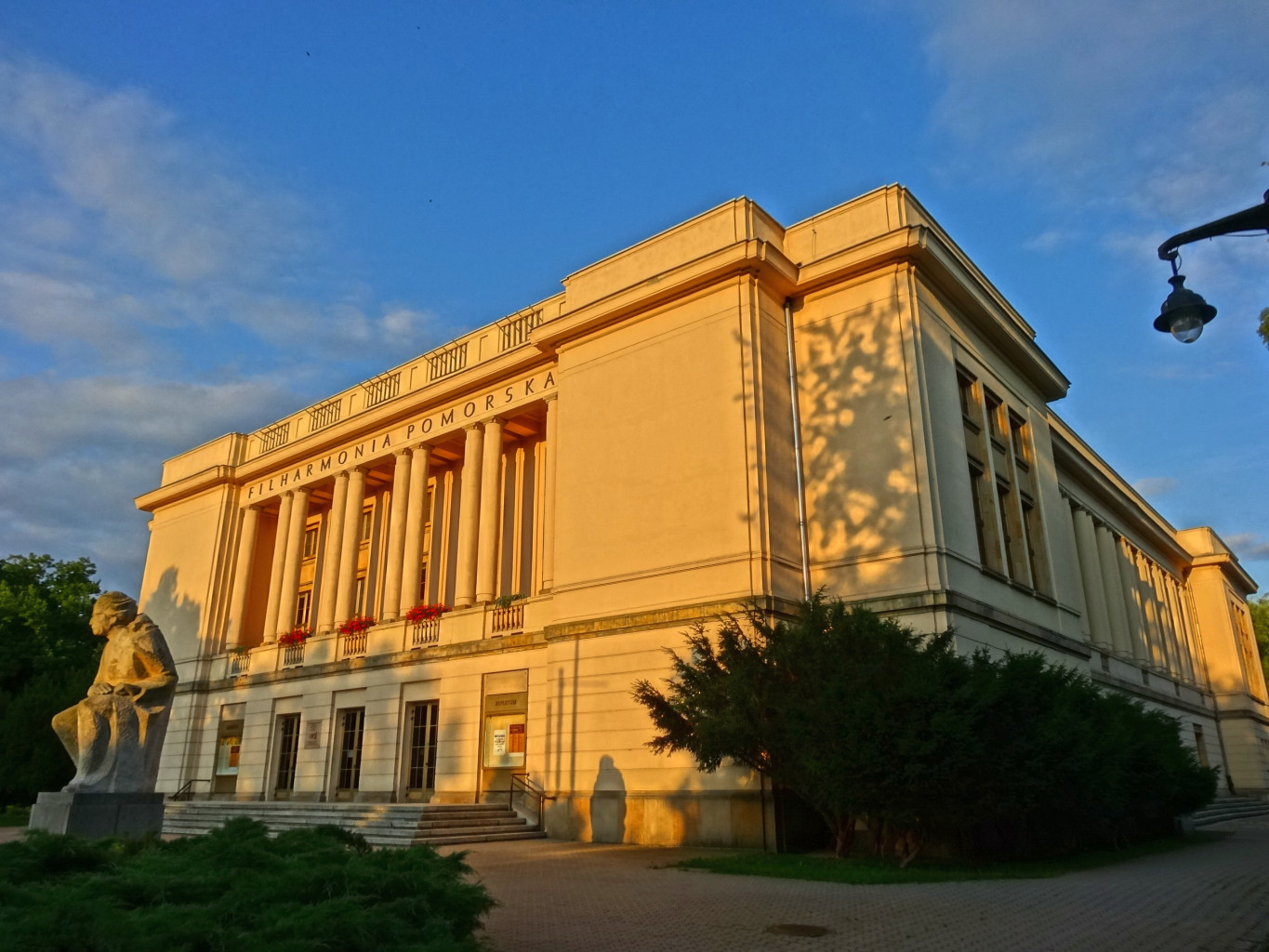
Pomeranian Philharmonic building

=== Other active Polish architects ===
Bronisław Jankowski
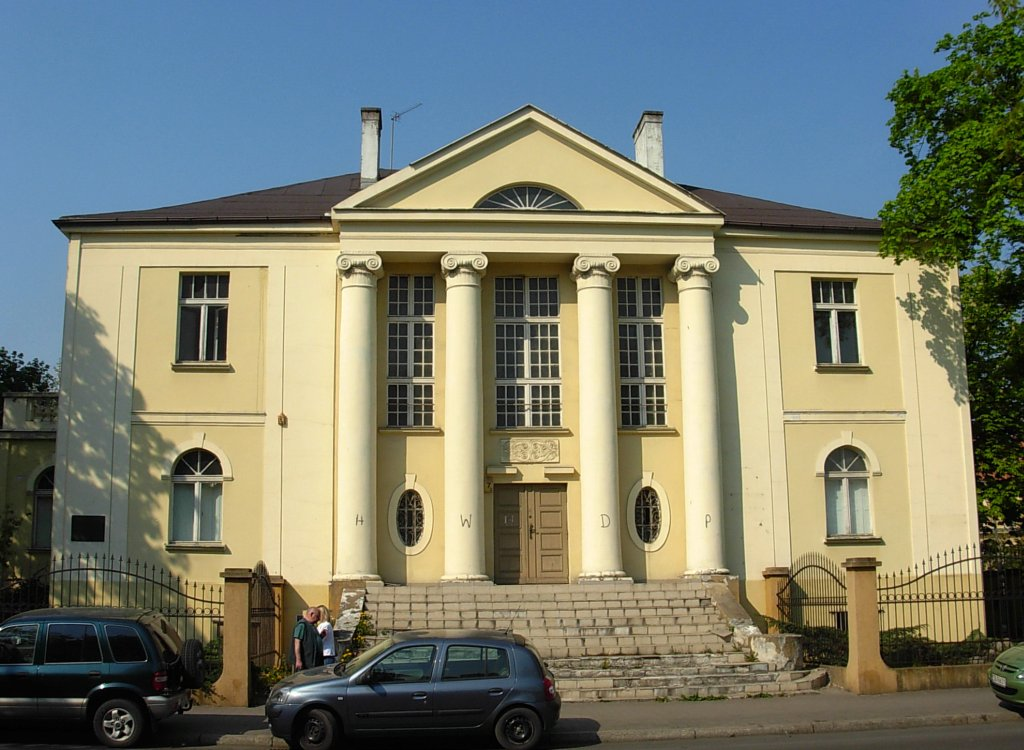
Villa at Ossoliński Alley 7 (1927–1929). Registered on Kuyavian-Pomeranian Voivodeship heritage list. During the Nazi occupation, the building housed the Westpreußen seat of Selbstschutz of western Prussia, as well as the Abwehr. After World War II, it was used by NKVD, and between 1947 and 2004, by a delegation of Polish Supreme Audit Office.

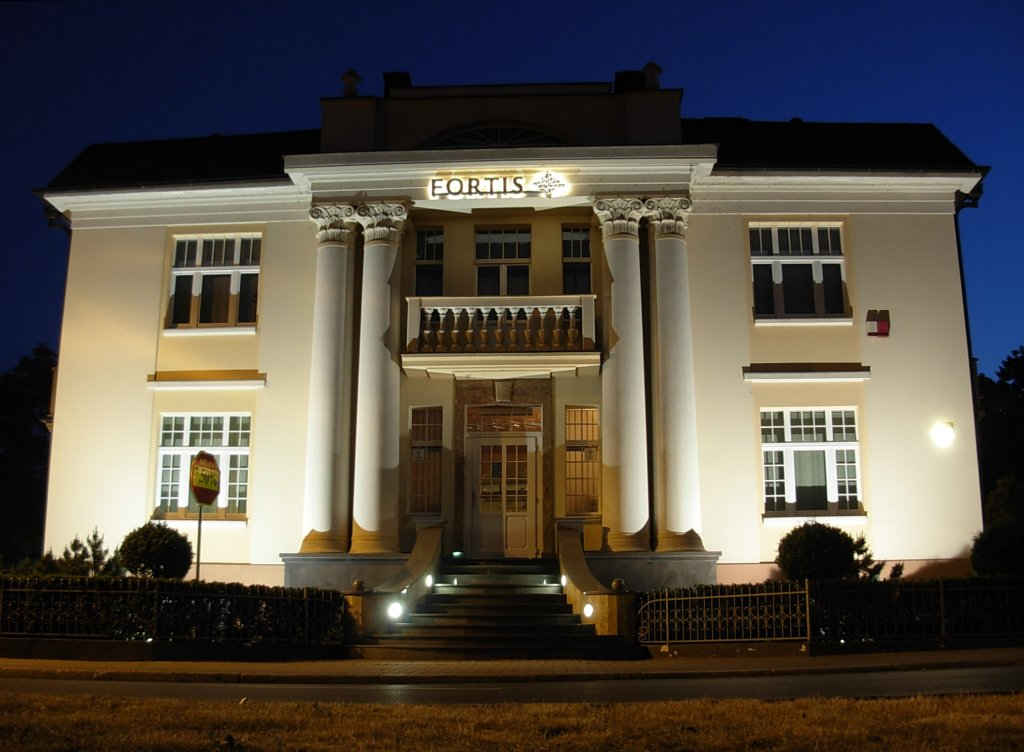
Villa at Ossoliński Alley 25 (1927–1929).

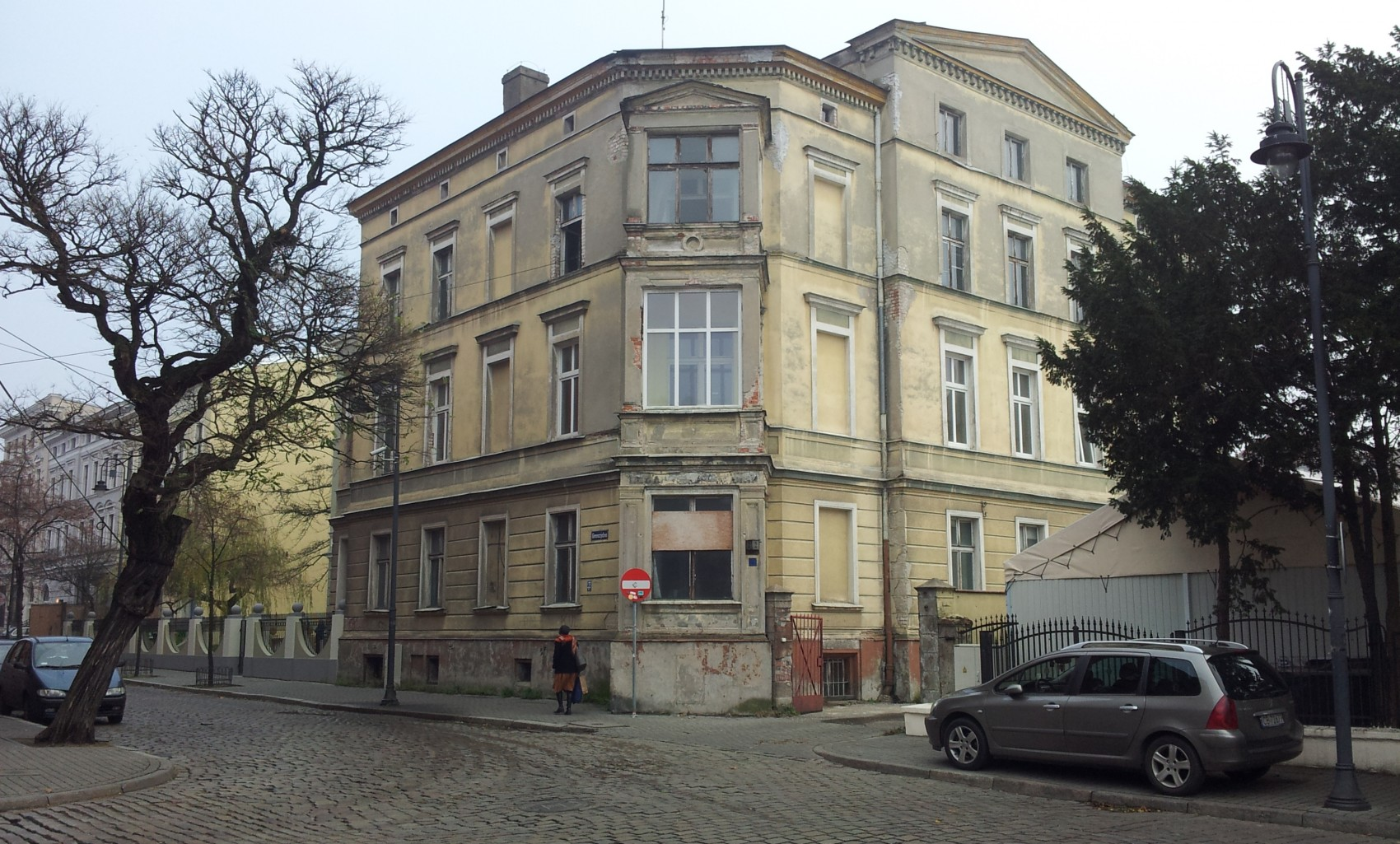
Tenement at 2 Gimnazjalna (1920s).

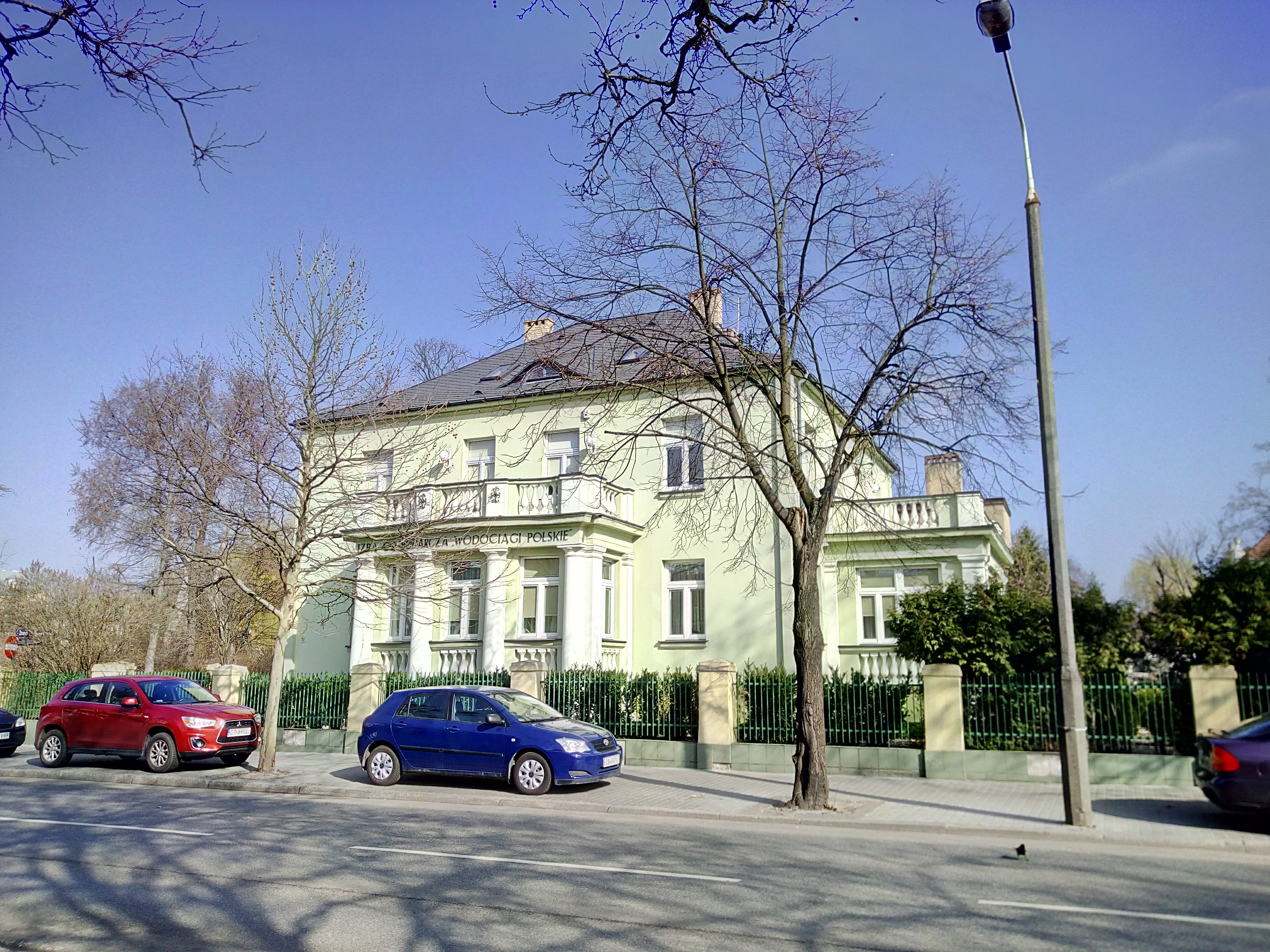
Villa at 2 Kasprowicza, corner with Markwarta street

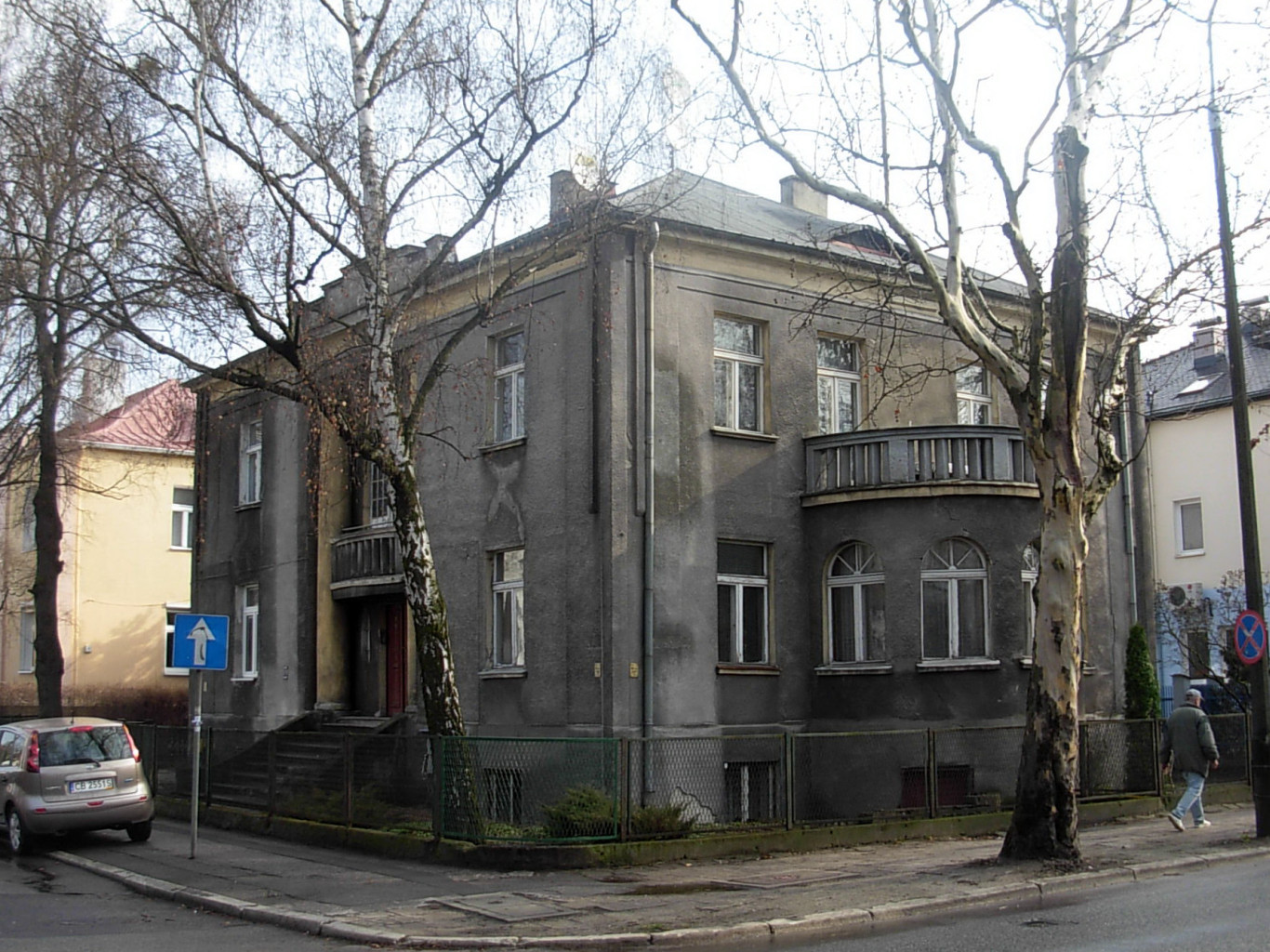
Villa at 2 Sielanka street, corner with Markwarta street

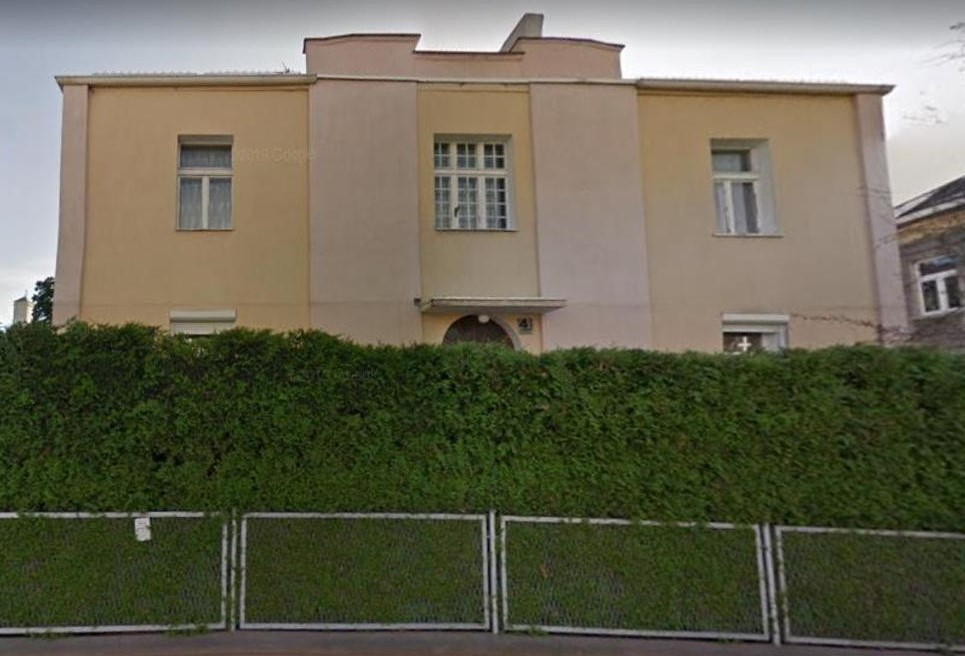
Villa at 4 Sielanka street (1927–1930)

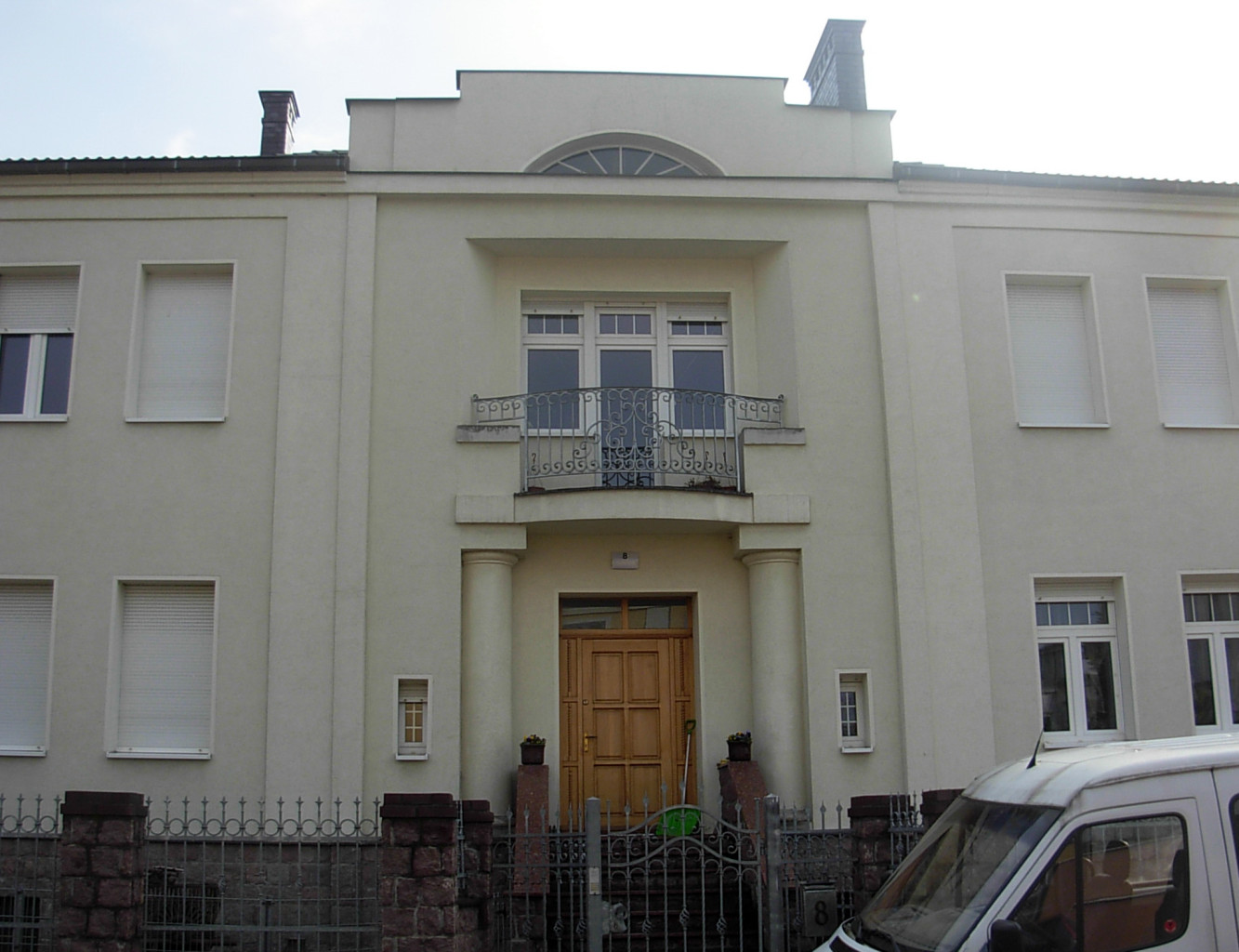
Gustaw Bernaczek Villa at 8 Sielanka street (1927–1929)

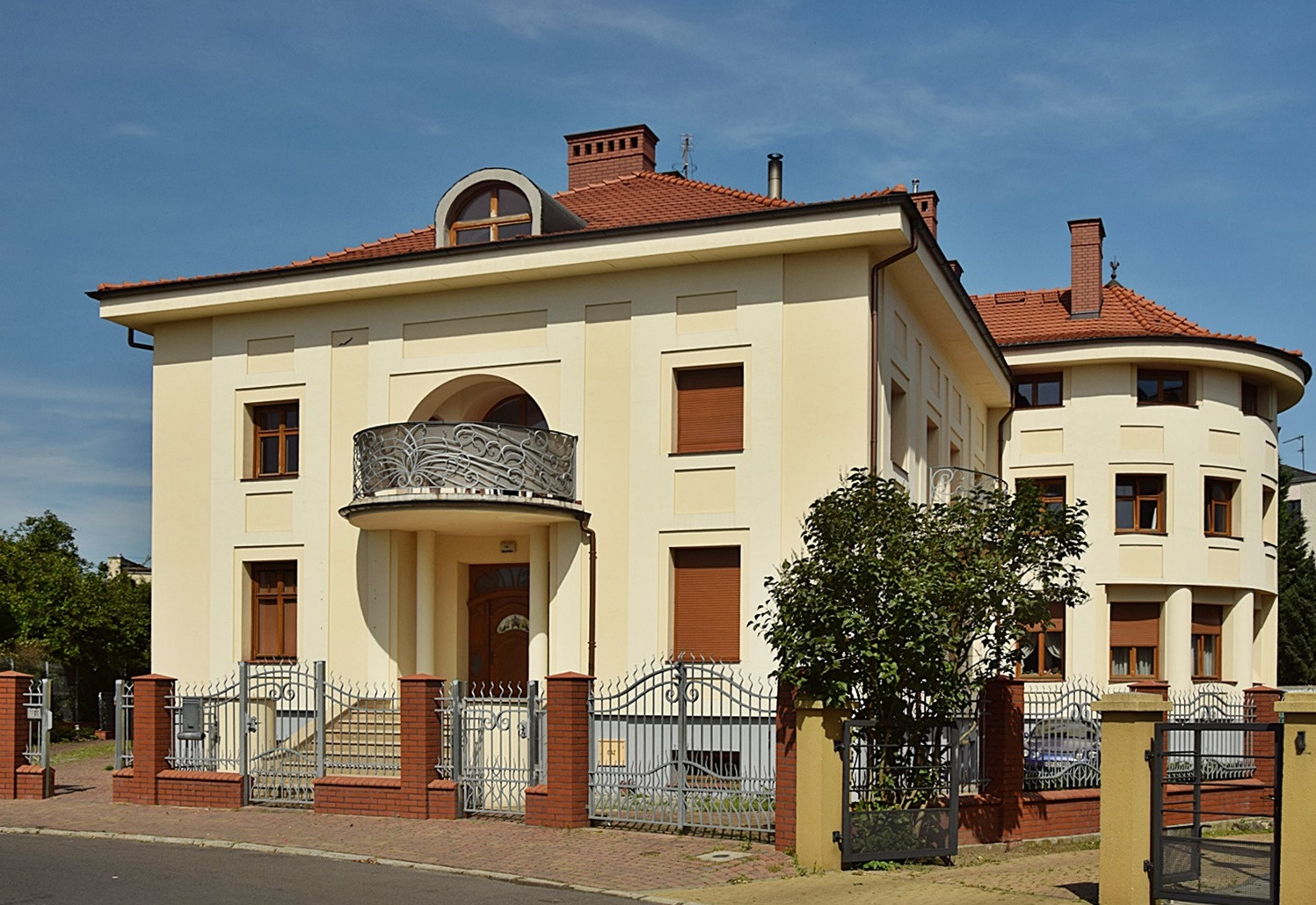
Villa at 10 Sielanka street (1927)

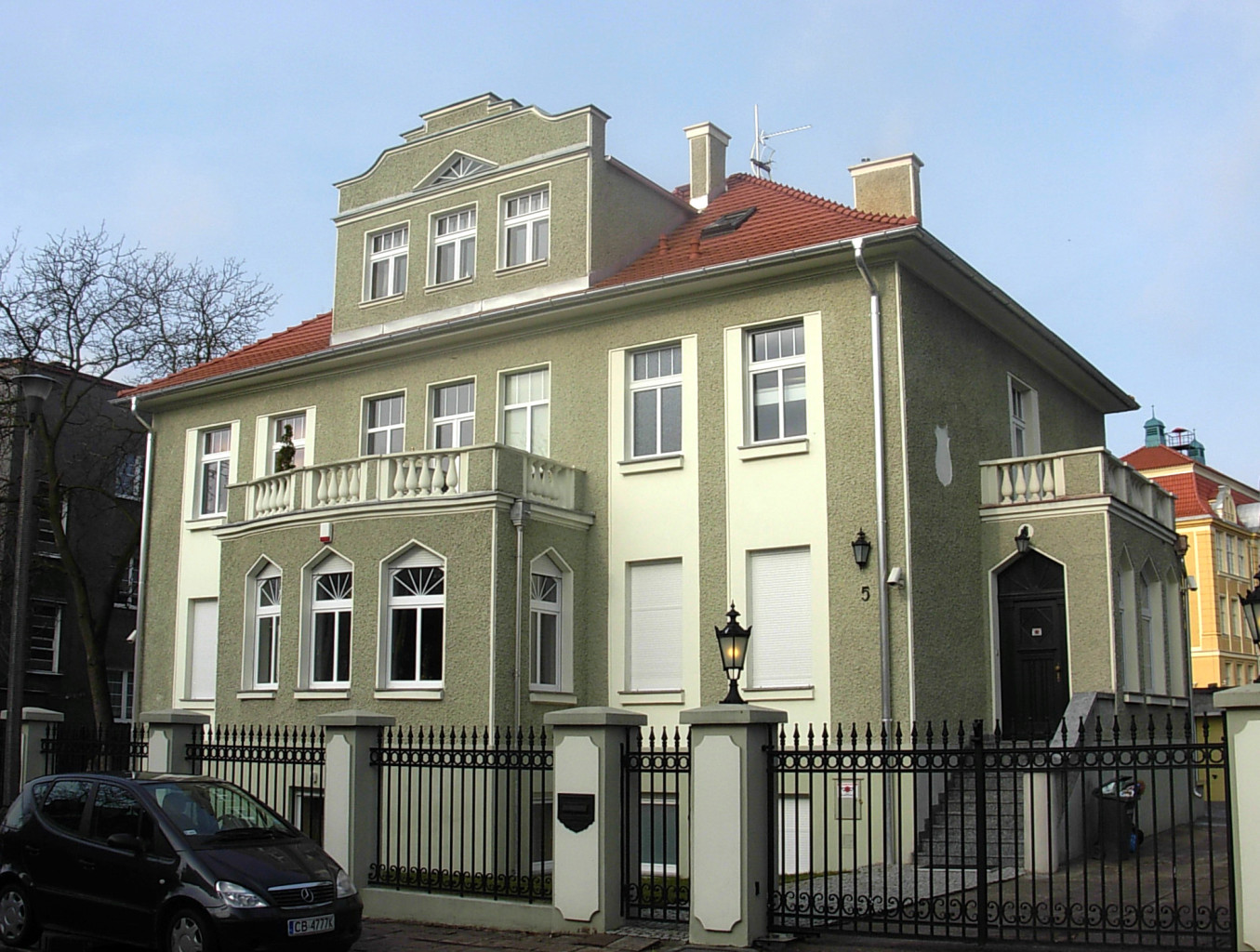
Villa at 5 Asnyka Street (1927–1931)

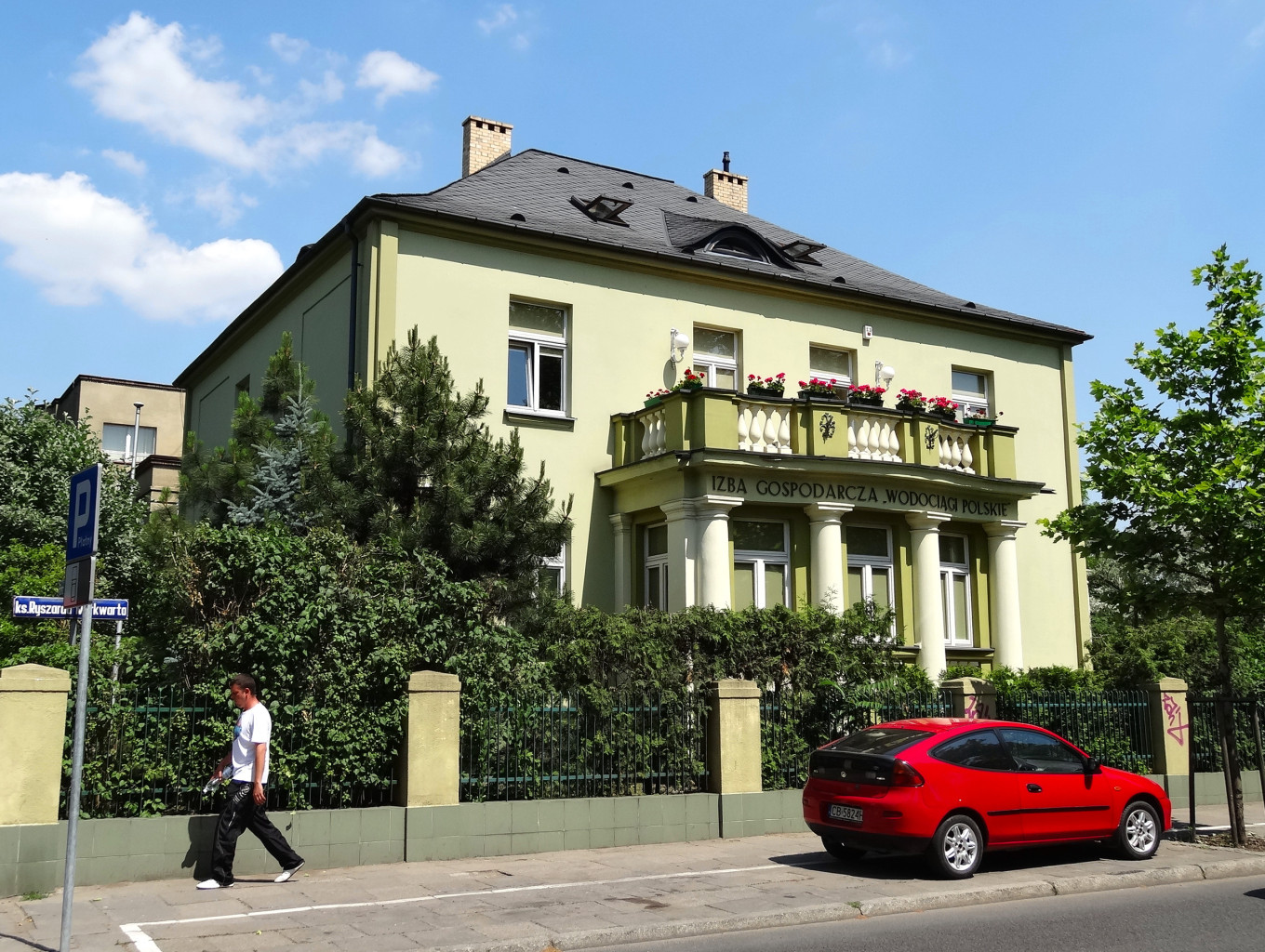
Villa at 2 Jana Kasprowicza Street (1927–1929)

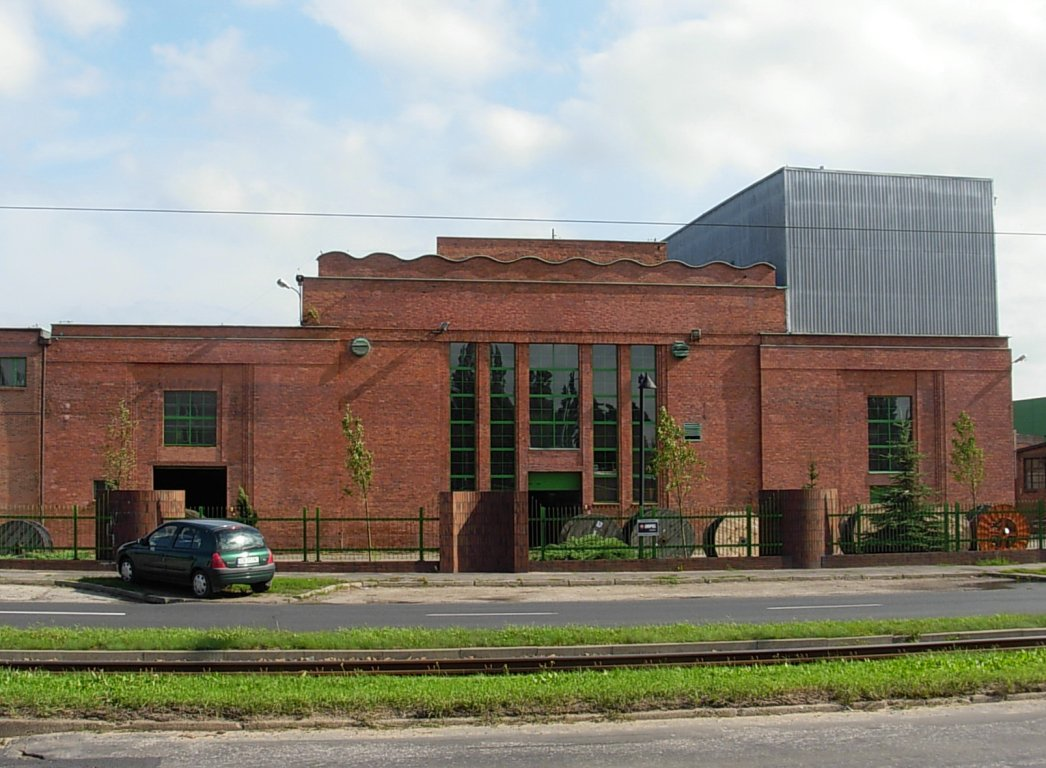
New hall of the Bydgoszcz Cable Factory (1928)
Bolesław Polakiewicz
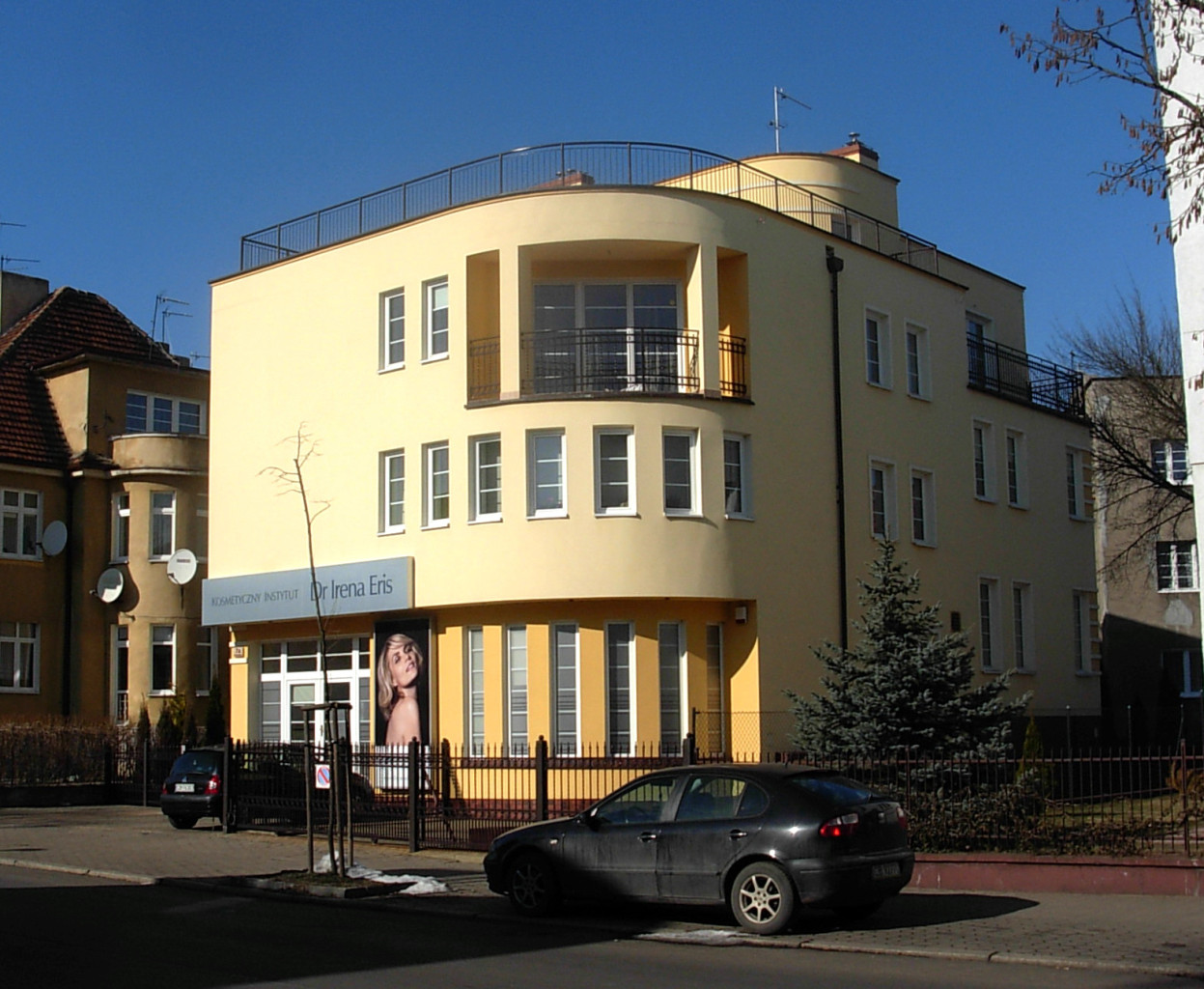
Villa at 7a Kopernika Street (1933–1935). Functionalism style.

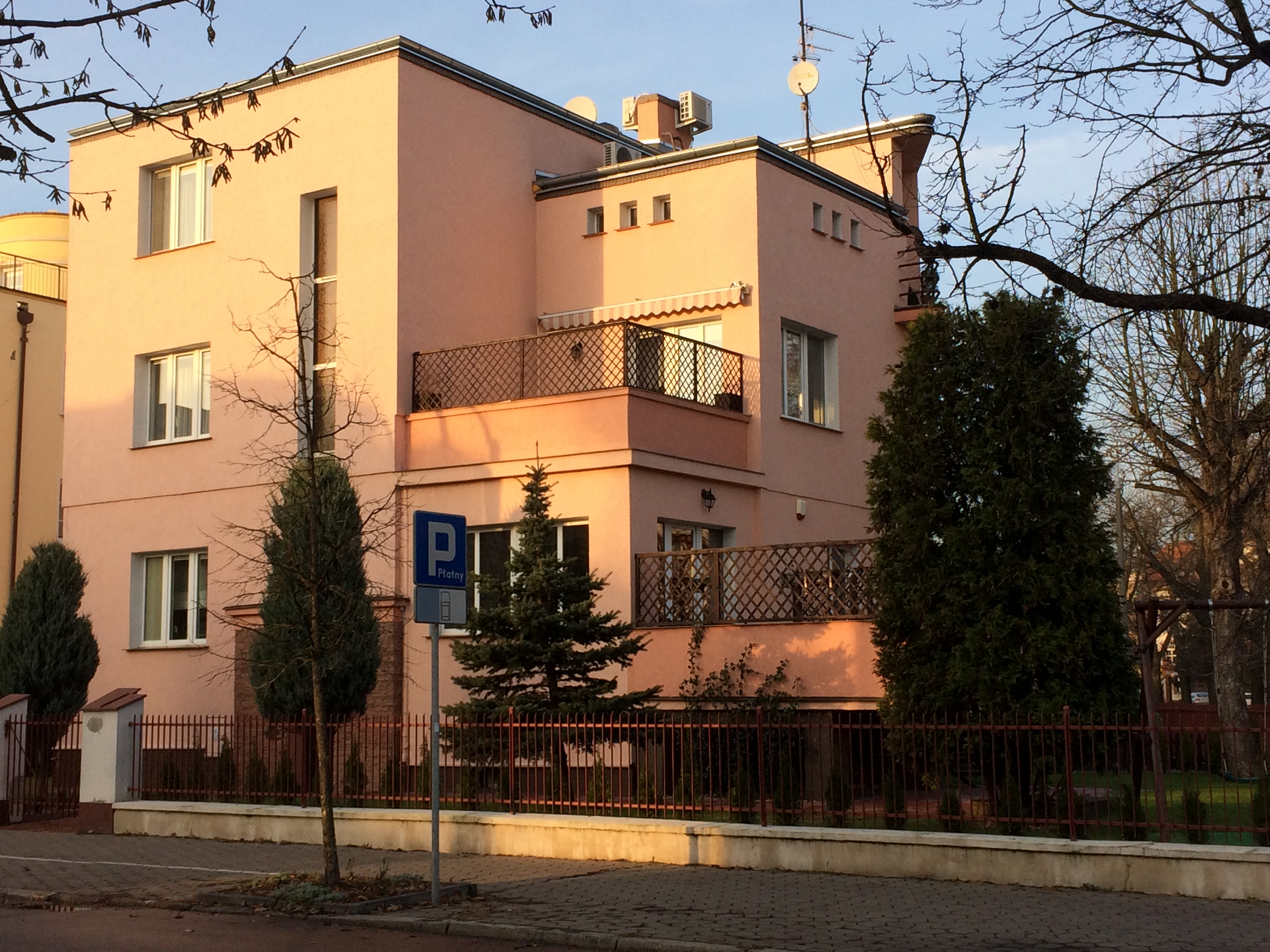
Villa at 9 Kopernika Street (1927–1929).

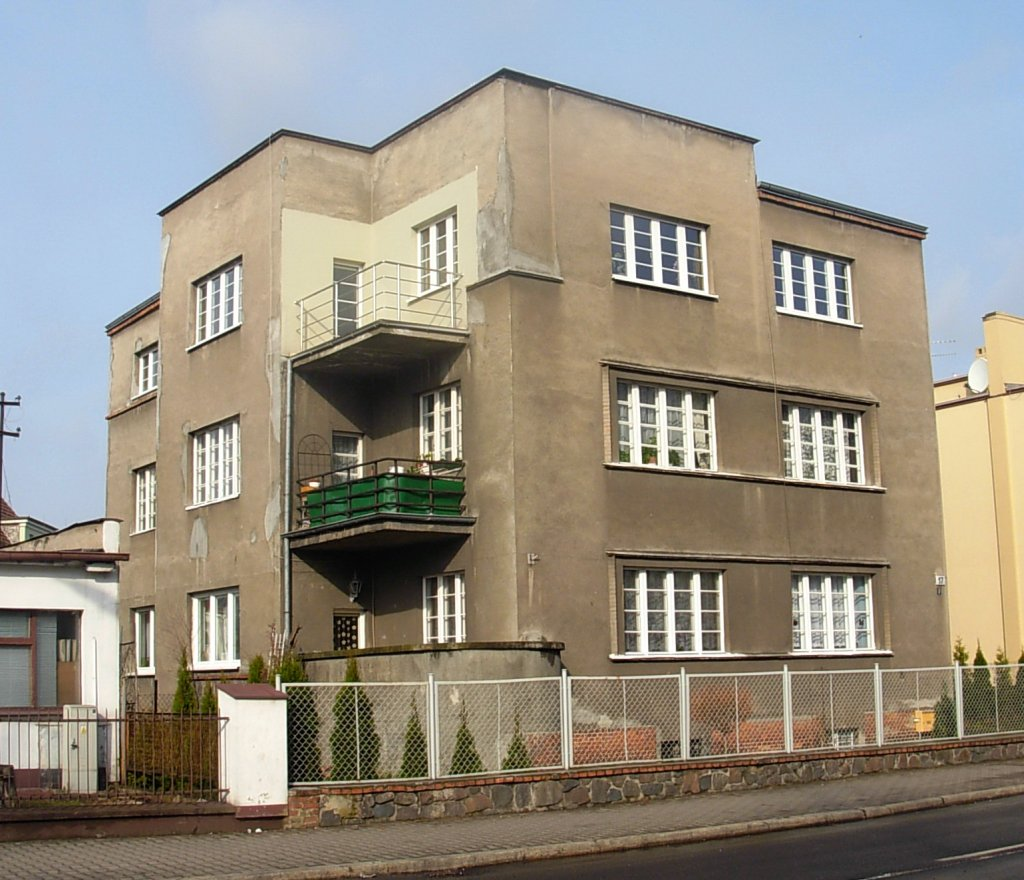
Villa at 17 Ossoliński Alley (1932–1933).

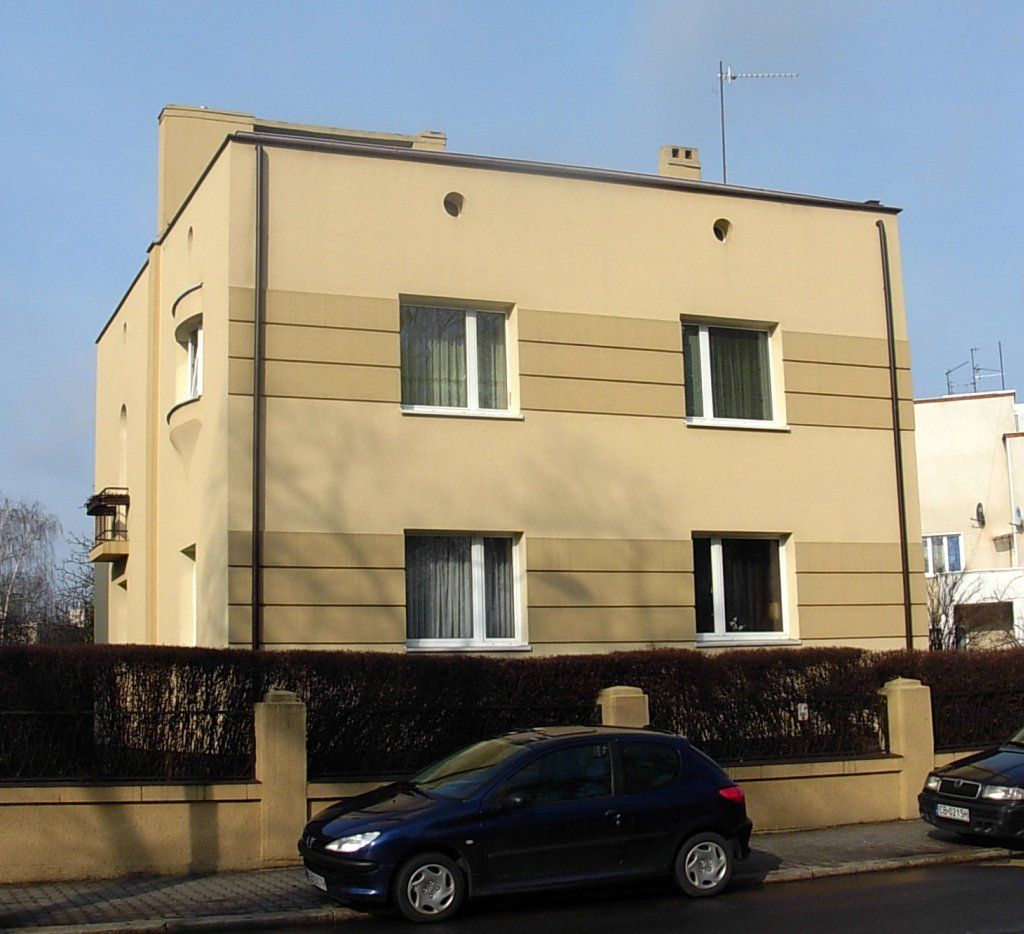
Villa at 19 Ossoliński Alley (1932–1933).

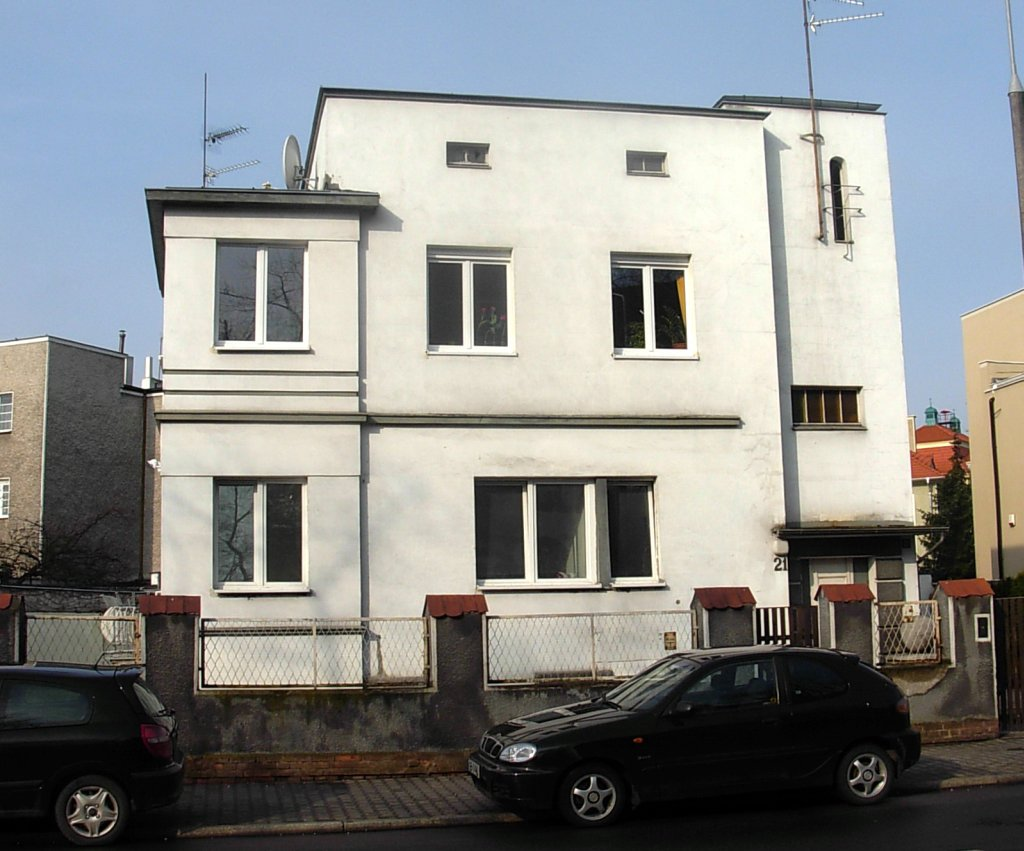
Villa at 21 Ossoliński Alley (1932–1933).

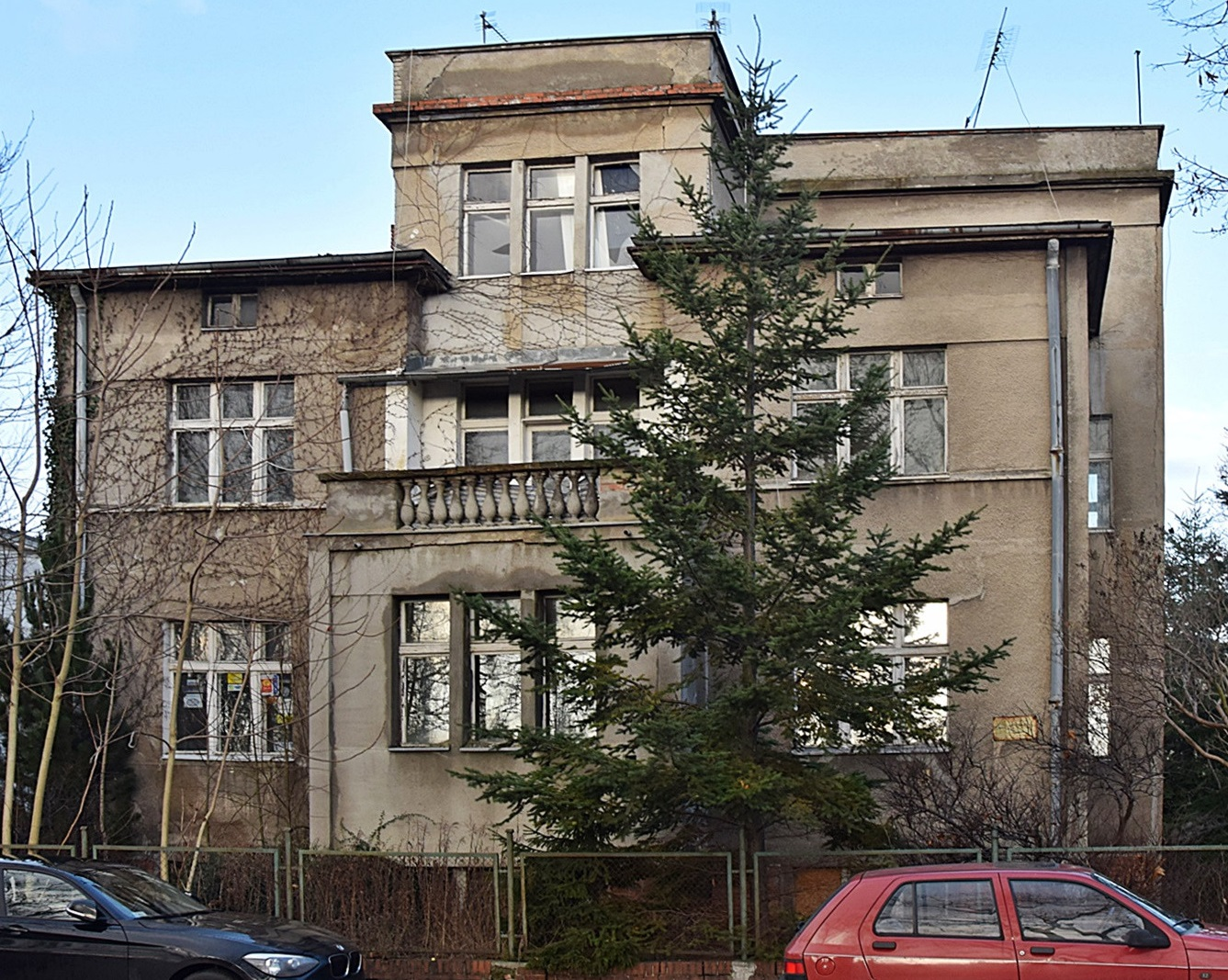
Villa at 1 Sielanka, corner with Markwarta street

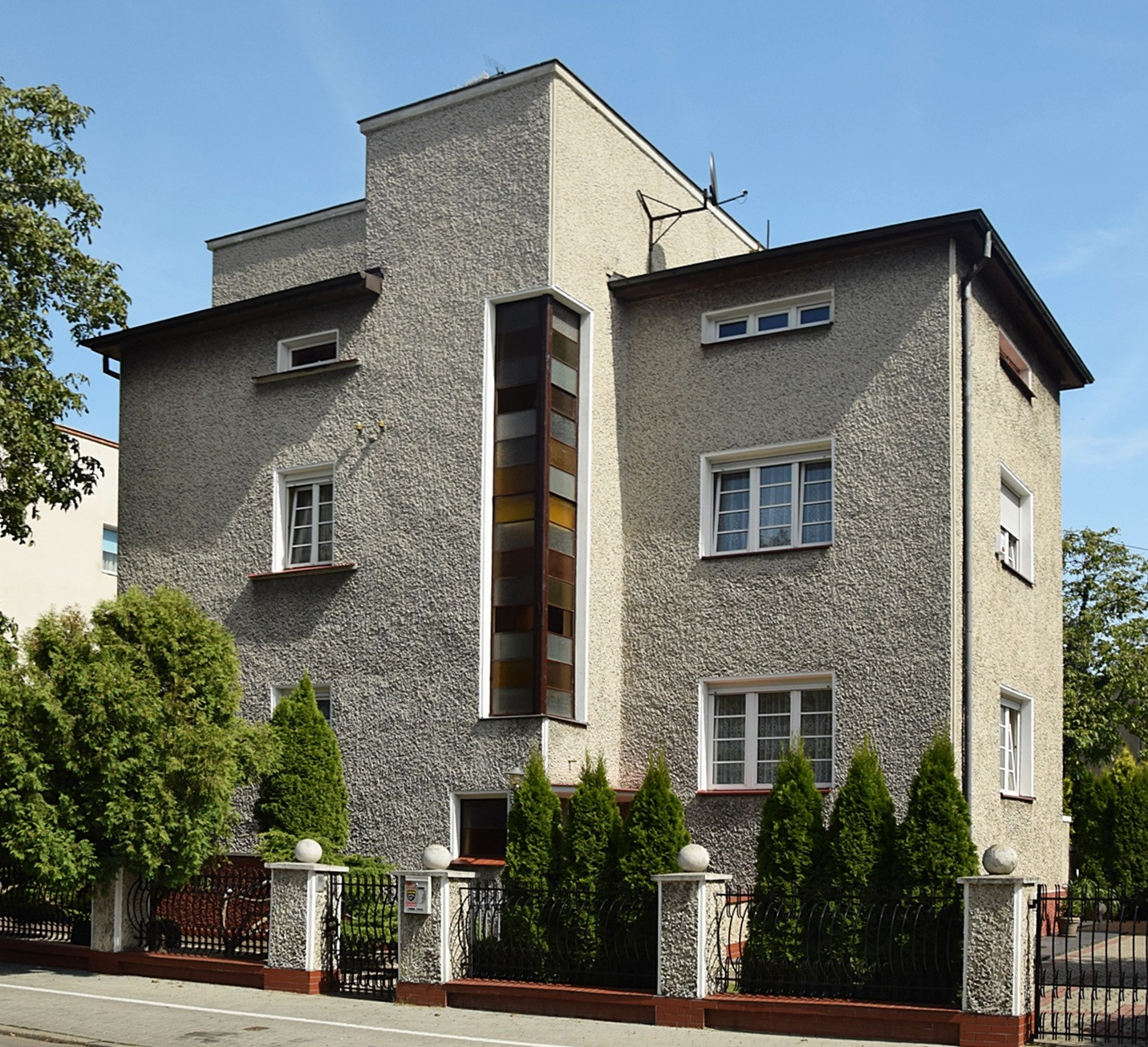
Villa at 2 Asnyka street

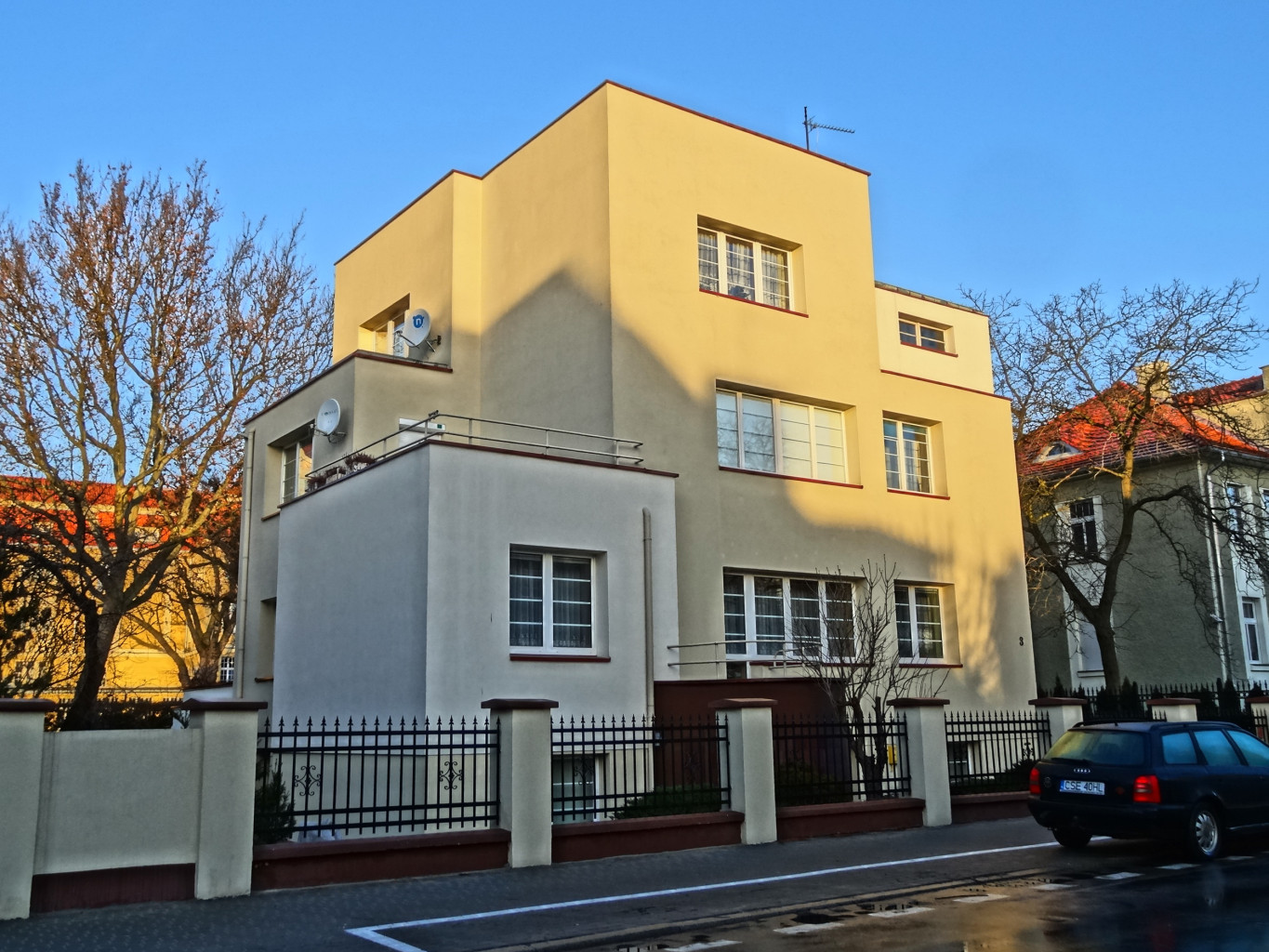
Villa at 3 Asnyka street

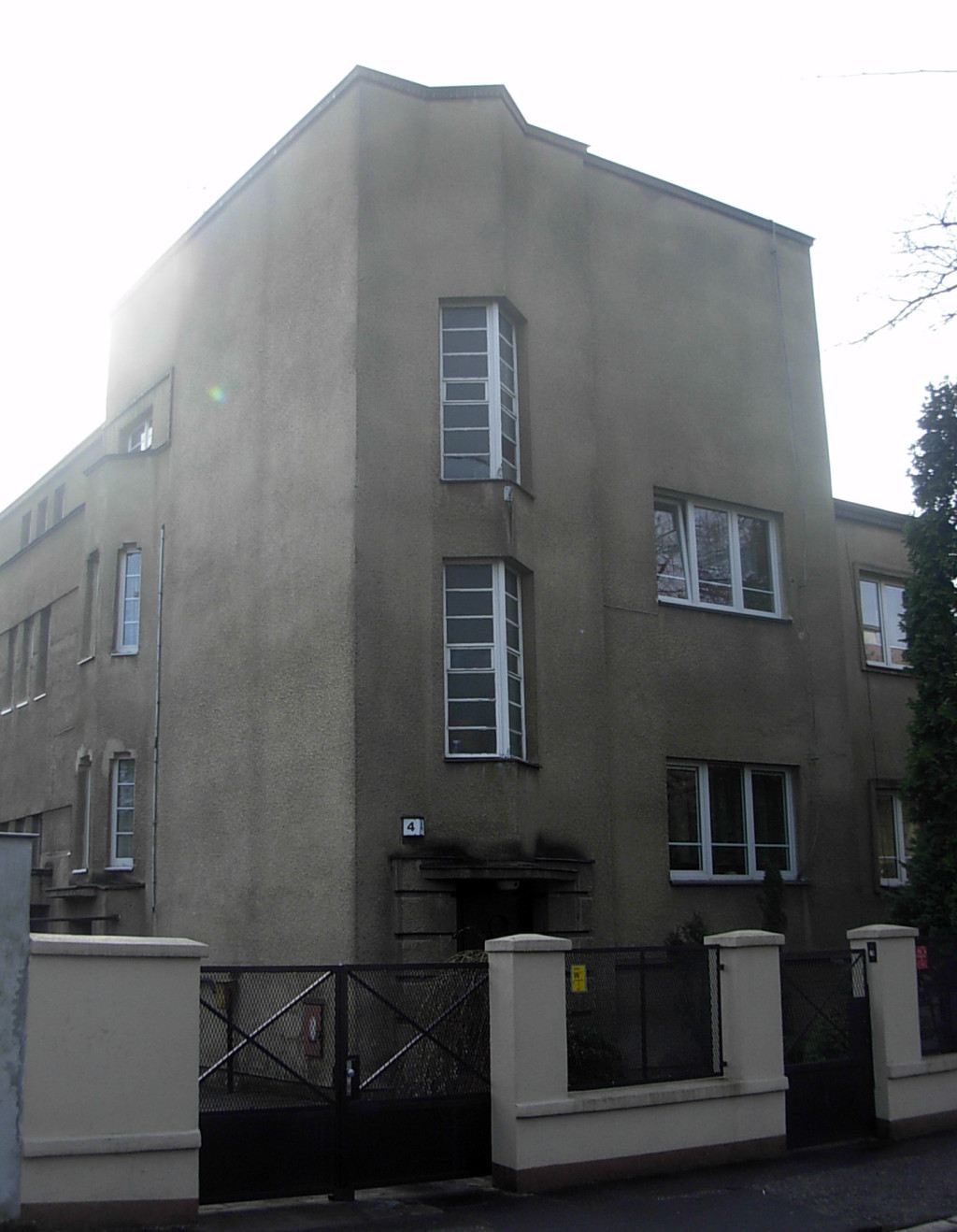
Villa at 4 Jana Kasprowicza Street (1933–1934)
Paweł Wawrzon
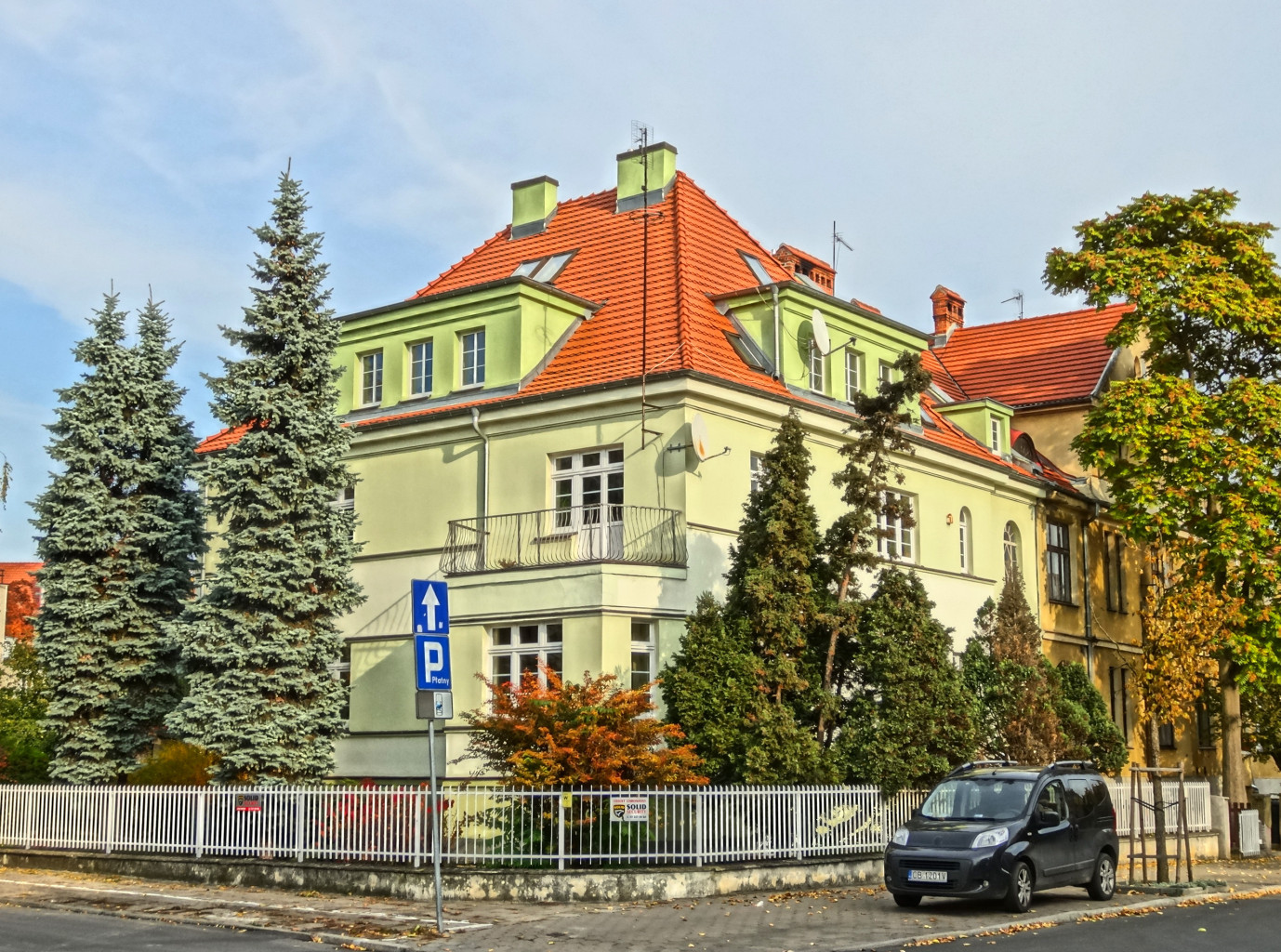
Villa at 3 Kopernika Street (1933–1935). Functionalism style.

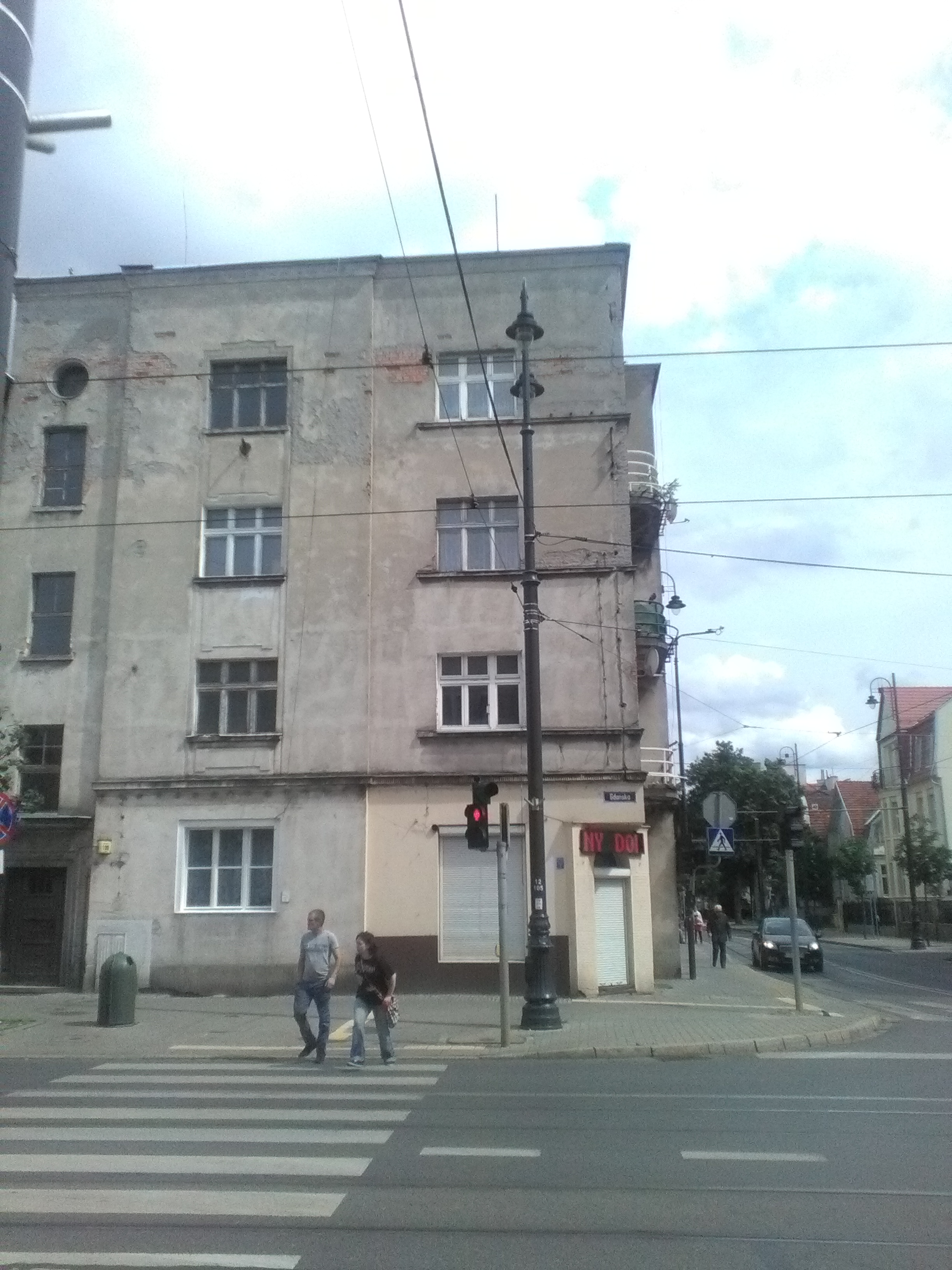
Tenement at 100 Gdańska Street (1930s). Functionalism style.
Józef Grodzki
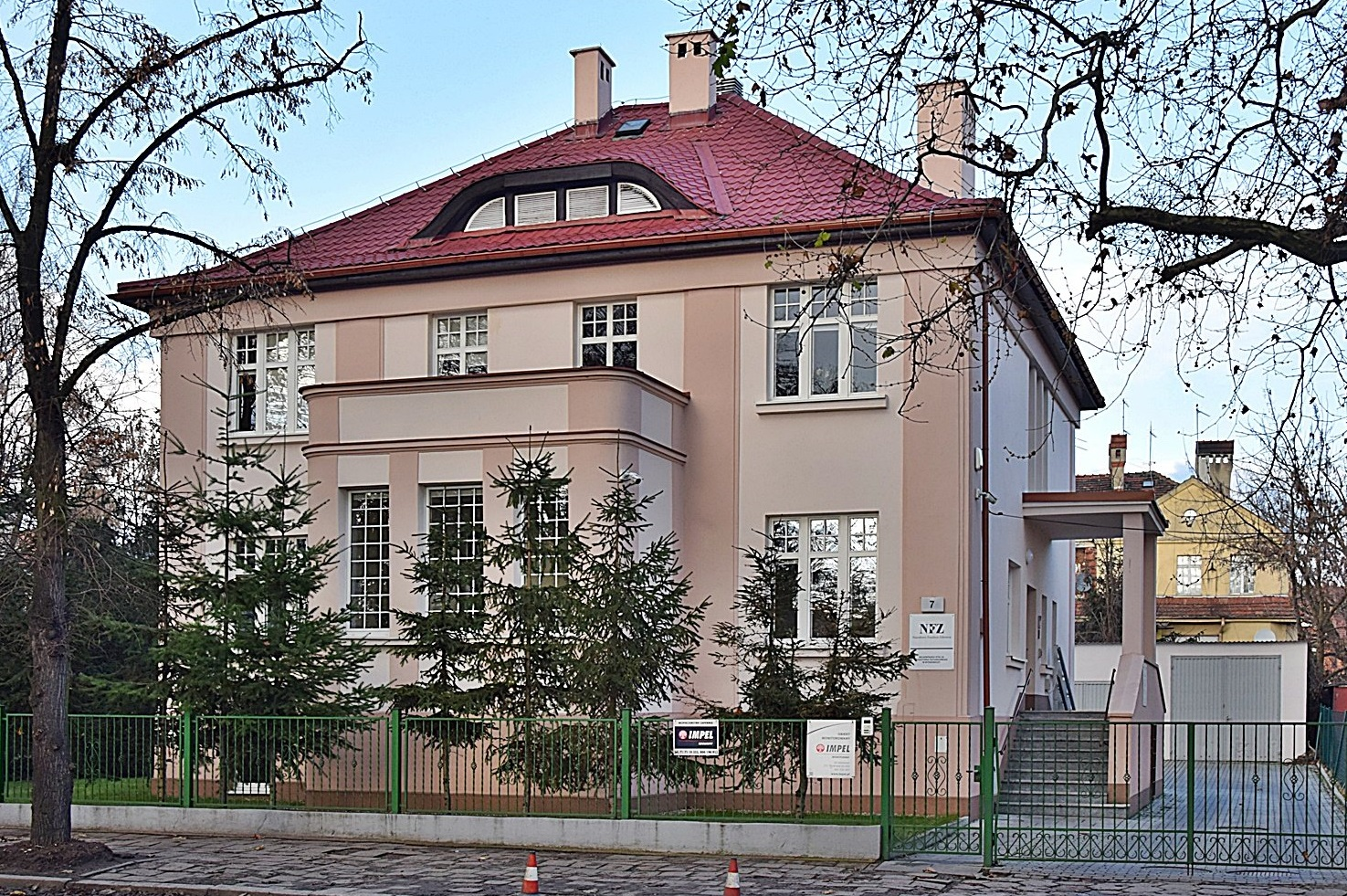
7 Markwarta street (1927–1928). Functionalism.

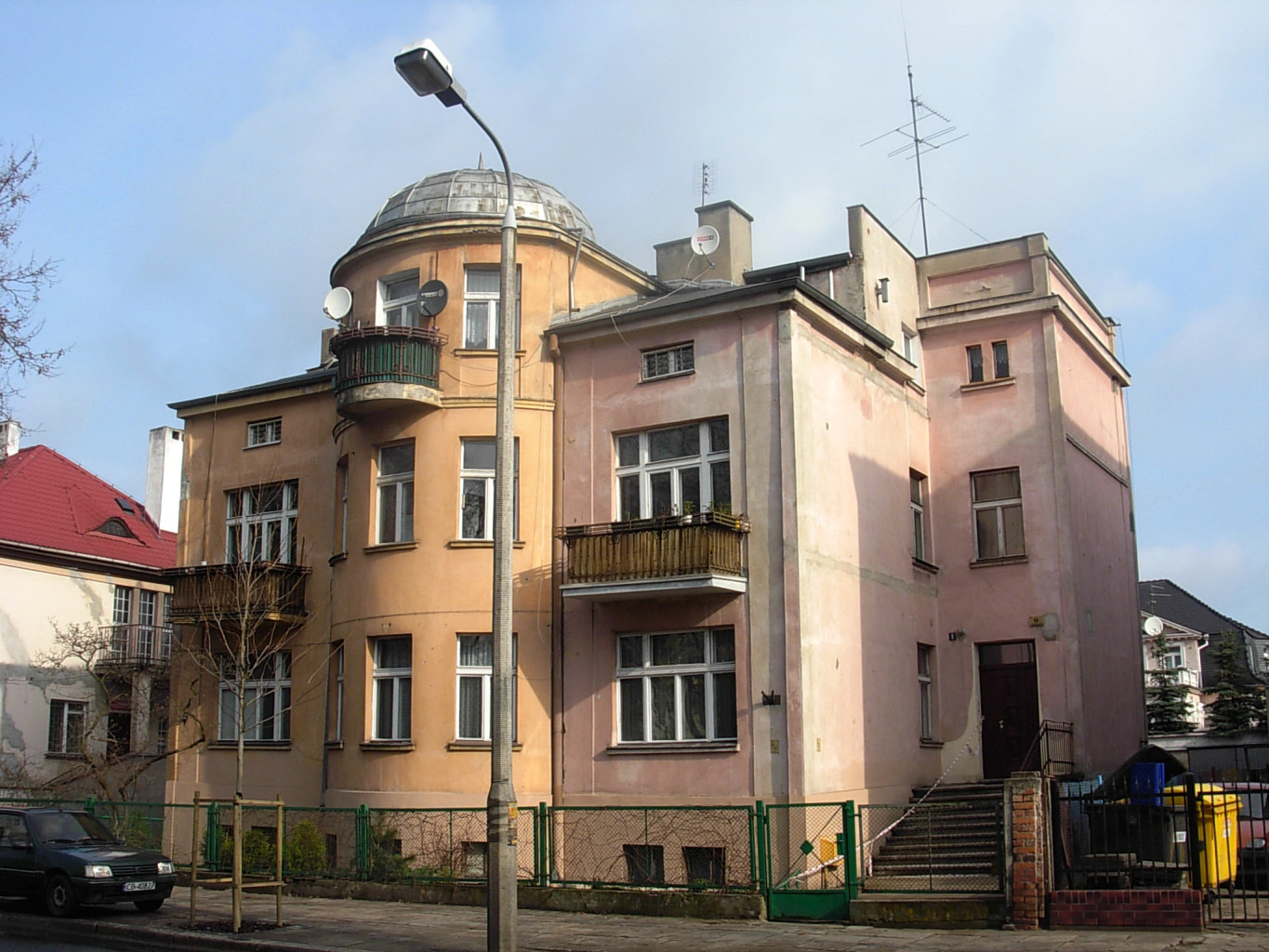
9 Markwarta street (1927–1929). Functionalism.

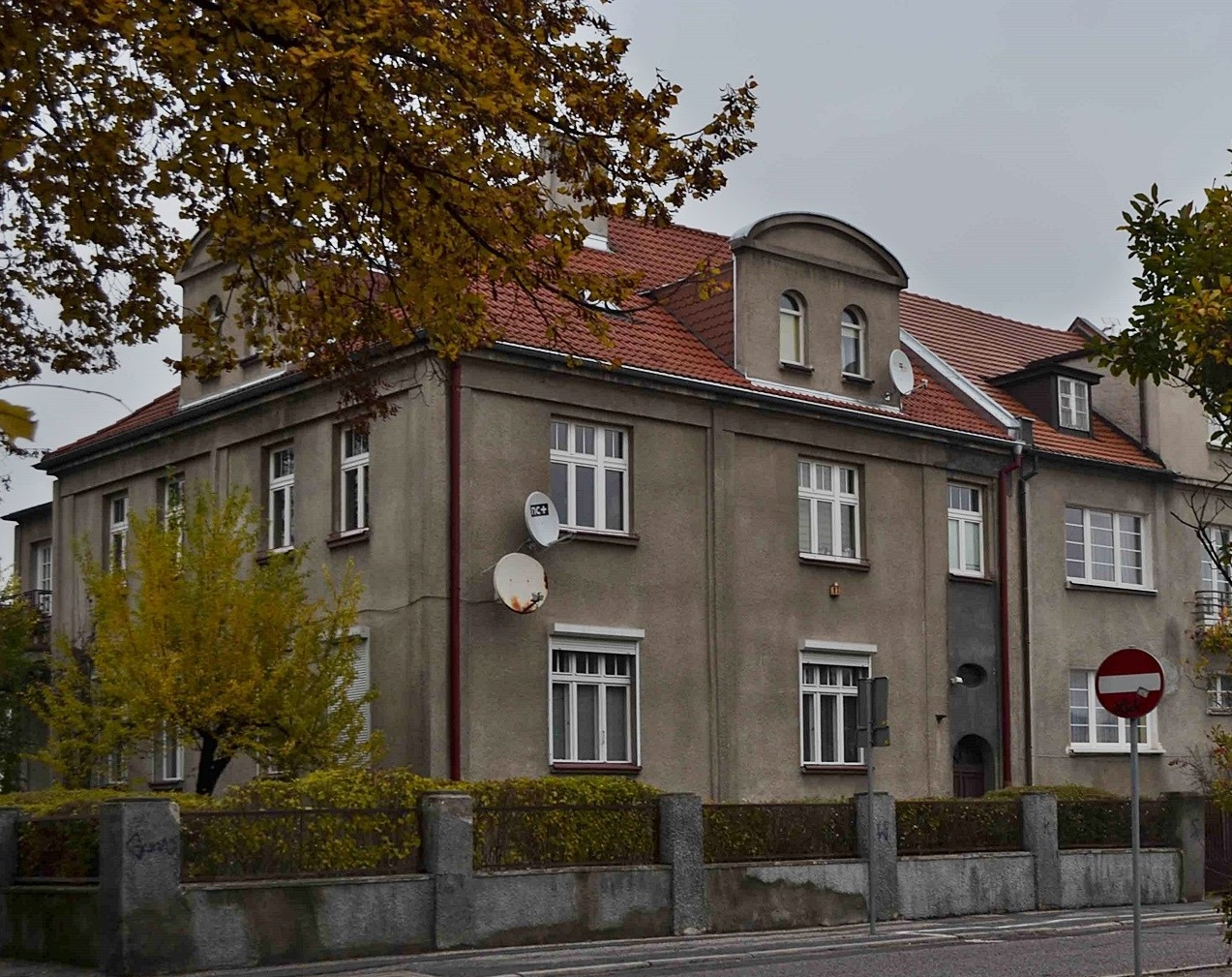
18 Sielanka Street (1927–1930). Functionalism.

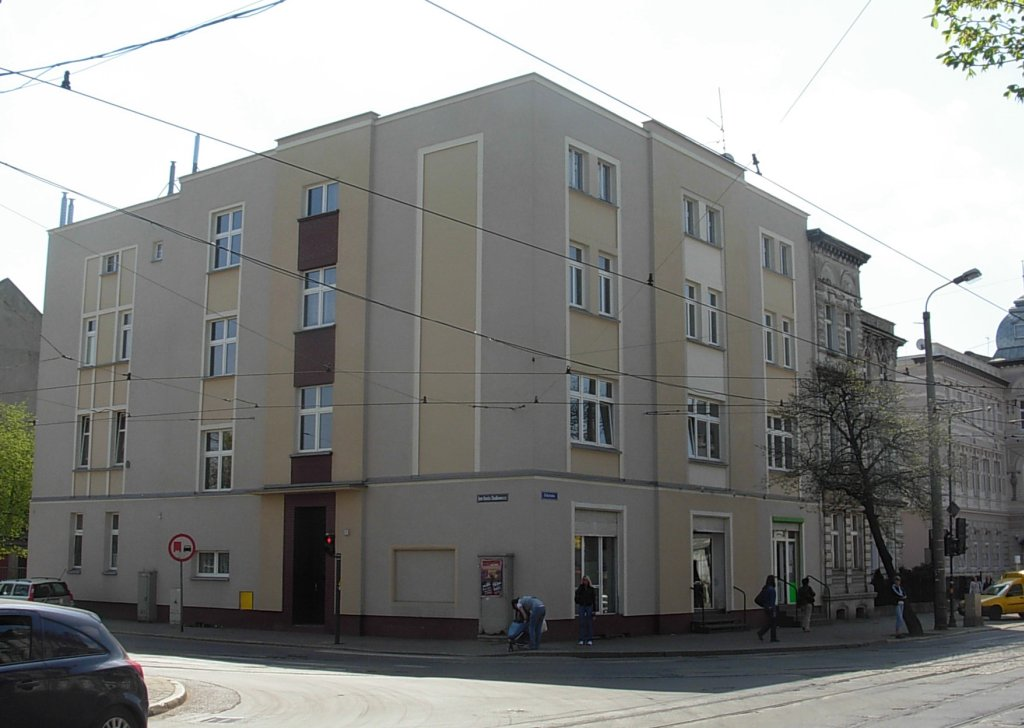
98 Gdańska Street, corner with Chodkiewicza Street (1932–1933). Functionalism.

==== Other noteworthy architects since 1920 ====
Name	Year	Building	Picture
Edward Stecewicz	1927–1931	Villa with functionalist features at 9 Ossoliński Alley.	
Stanislaw Mankowski	1930–1931	Villa at 10 Kopernika Street.	
Alfred Müller	1930–1934	Functionalist building at 89 Nakielska street, which housed Pomeranian Bike Factory REKORD- Willy Jahr (PFR)	
Henryk Misterek	1932–1933	Villa with functionalist features at 11 Ossoliński Alley.	
Józef Trojański	1934	Villa at 65 Jana Karola Chodkiewicza Street, corner with Lelewela street	
Dzielinski Konstanty	1934–1935	Functionalist-type house at 6 Józef Weyssenhoff Square.	
Adam Ballenstedt	1945	St. Vincent de Paul Basilica Minor in Bydgoszcz, registered on Kuyavian-Pomeranian Voivodeship Heritage List, Nr.601231, Reg.A/846/1-2, May 30, 1996	
Bronislaw Jablonski	1966–1969	The 14-storey tower at 1/3 Konarskiego Street is part of additions to the 19th century original edifice, where now seats the Kuyavian-Pomeranian Voivodeship administration and leadership.	

== See also ==
- Bydgoszcz
- Bogdan Raczkowski
- Fritz Weidner
- Rudolf Kern
- Józef Święcicki
- Anton Hoffmann
- Jan Kossowski
- Stefan Klajbor

== Bibliography ==
- Derkowska-Kostkowska, Bogna (2007). Miejscy radcy budowlani w Bydgoszczy w latach 1871-1912. MATERIAŁY DO DZIEJOW KULTURY I SZTUKI BYDGOSZCZY I REGIONU Z.12 (in Polish). Bydgoszcz: Pracownia dokumentacji i popularyzacji zabytków wojewódzkiego ośrodka kultury w Bydgoszczy. pp. 11–22.
- Bręczewska-Kulesza, Daria (1999). Bydgoskie realizacje Heinricha Seelinga. Materiały do dziejów kultury i sztuki Bydgoszczy i regionu. Zeszyt 4 (in Polish). Bydgoszcz: Pracownia Dokumentacji i Popularyzacji Zabytków Wojewódzkiego Ośrodka Kultury w Bydgoszczy.
- Jastrzębska-Puzowska, Iwona (2006). Od miasteczka do metropolii. Rozwój architektoniczny i urbanistyczny Bydgoszczy w latach 1850–1920 (in Polish). Bydgoszcz: Mado. ISBN 9788389886712.
- Winter, Piotr (1996). Ulica Augusta Cieszkowskiego w Bydgoszczy. Zespół architektoniczny z przełomu XIX i XX wieku (in Polish). Bydgoszcz: Wojewódzki Ośrodek Kultury w Bydgoszczy. p. 13. ISBN 9788386970049.
