= Carl Meyer Tenement =

Carl Meyer tenement
- Polish: Kamienica Carla Meyera w Bydgoszczy
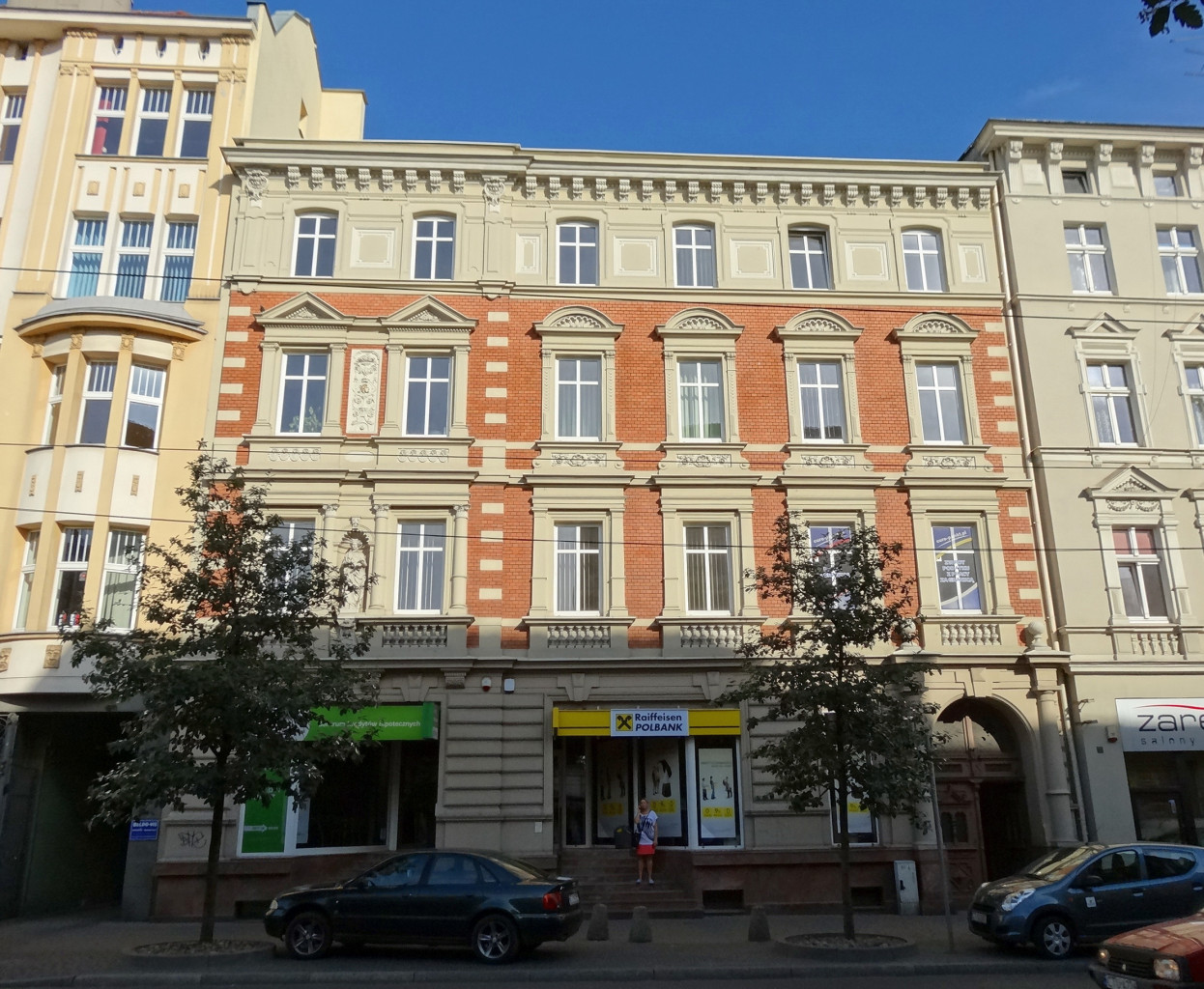
- Tenement from Gdańska Street
- Interactive map of the Carl Meyer tenement area

General information
- Type: Tenement
- Architectural style: Eclecticism
- Location: 60 Gdańska Street, Bydgoszcz, Poland
- Coordinates: 53°7′51″N 18°0′32″E
- Groundbreaking: 1891
- Completed: 1892
- Client: Carl Meyer

Technical details
- Floor count: 4

Design and construction
- Architect: Carl Meyer

Carl Meyer tenement is a habitation house located at 60 Gdańska street, Bydgoszcz, Poland.

== Location ==
The building stands on the eastern side of Gdańska Street, between Słowackiego street and Adam Mickiewicz Alley. It is adjacent to:

- Aleksander Olszyński Tenement at 58;
- Alfred Schleusener Tenement at 62;

both historical buildings in Bydgoszcz.

== History ==
The edifice was designed and built in 1891–1892 by the architect Carl Meyer from Bromberg for his own use; he lived in the city from 1885 to 1913.

At the time of its erection, the tenement was located at 138 Danzigerstraße. Carl Meyer built several other edifices in downtown Bydgoszcz, among others:

- House at 6 Cieszkowskiego Street;
- Bydgoszcz Water supply station, along with architect Marshall.

After Meyer's departure, during the interwar period, the building housed the Scientific Society of Physicians (Polish: Naukowe Towarzystwo Lekarzy) from 1913 to 1923.

== Architecture ==
The house boasts eclecticism forms with Dutch Mannerism in its brick facade.

On the frontage, in a niche between the windows of the first floor, is located a sculpture of a woman, holding a roll of paper and a compass, as an allegory of Architecture and Construction. This all refers to the profession of Carl Meyer, as builder of this tenement.

It is not without reminding allegories displayed on the tenement at 9 Gdańska Street. Another detail is the initials MC (i.e. Meyer Carl), placed between the windows of the second floor.

The building's interiors are particularly characterized by wood carving works at the gate, preserved original stained glass, and pilaster-arcades with stucco details in the entrance hallway.

== Gallery ==
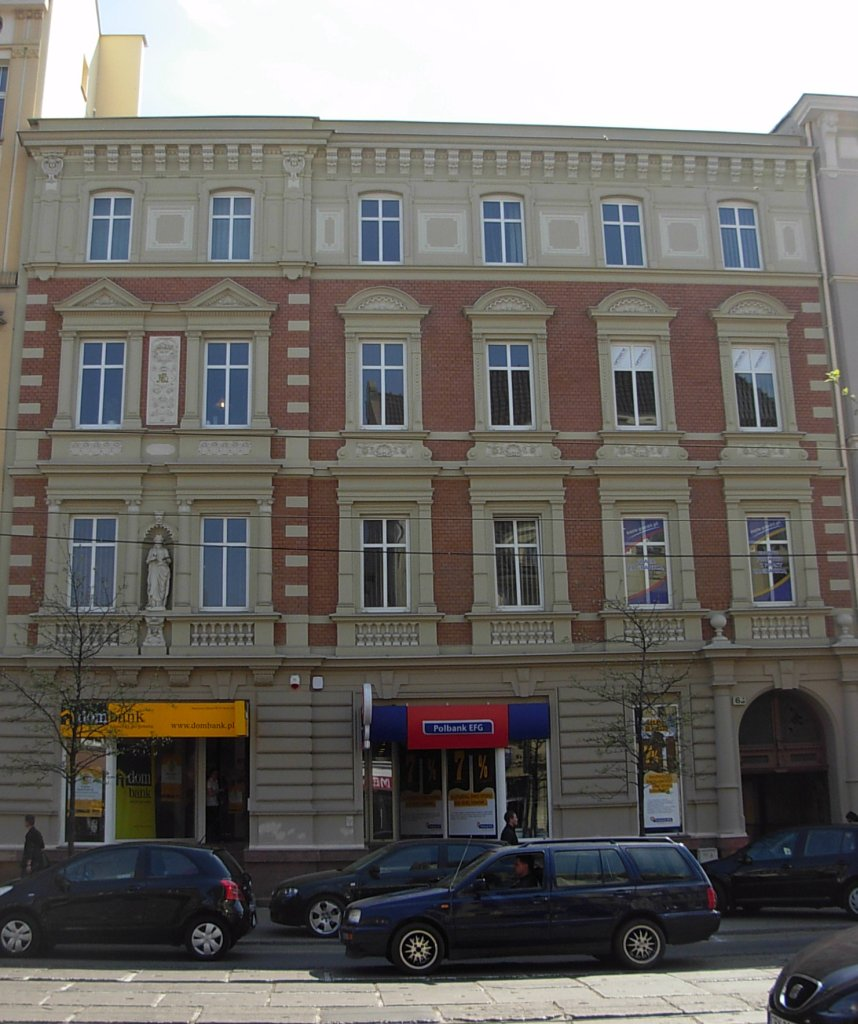
Zoomed view from Gdańska street

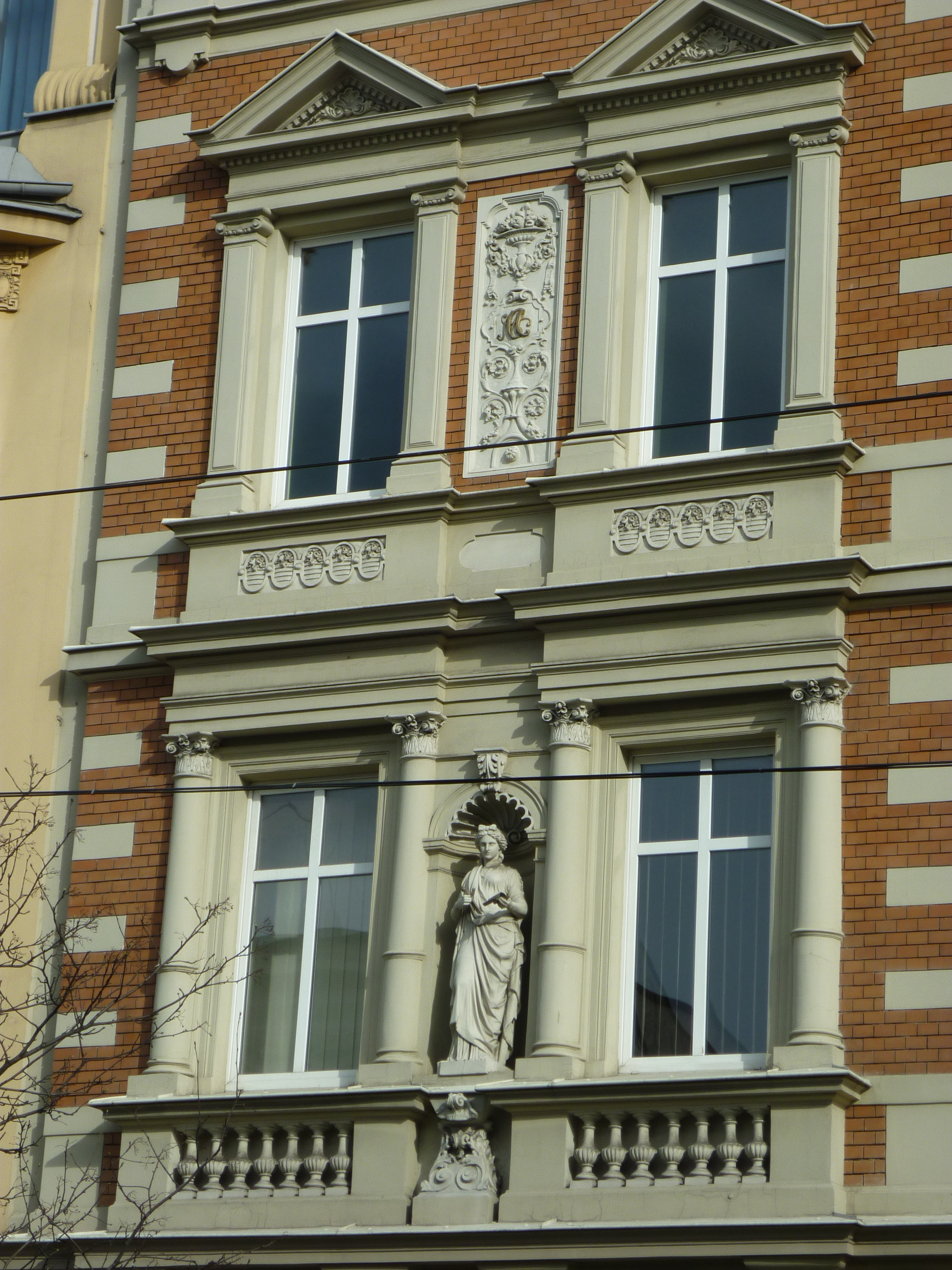
Facade details

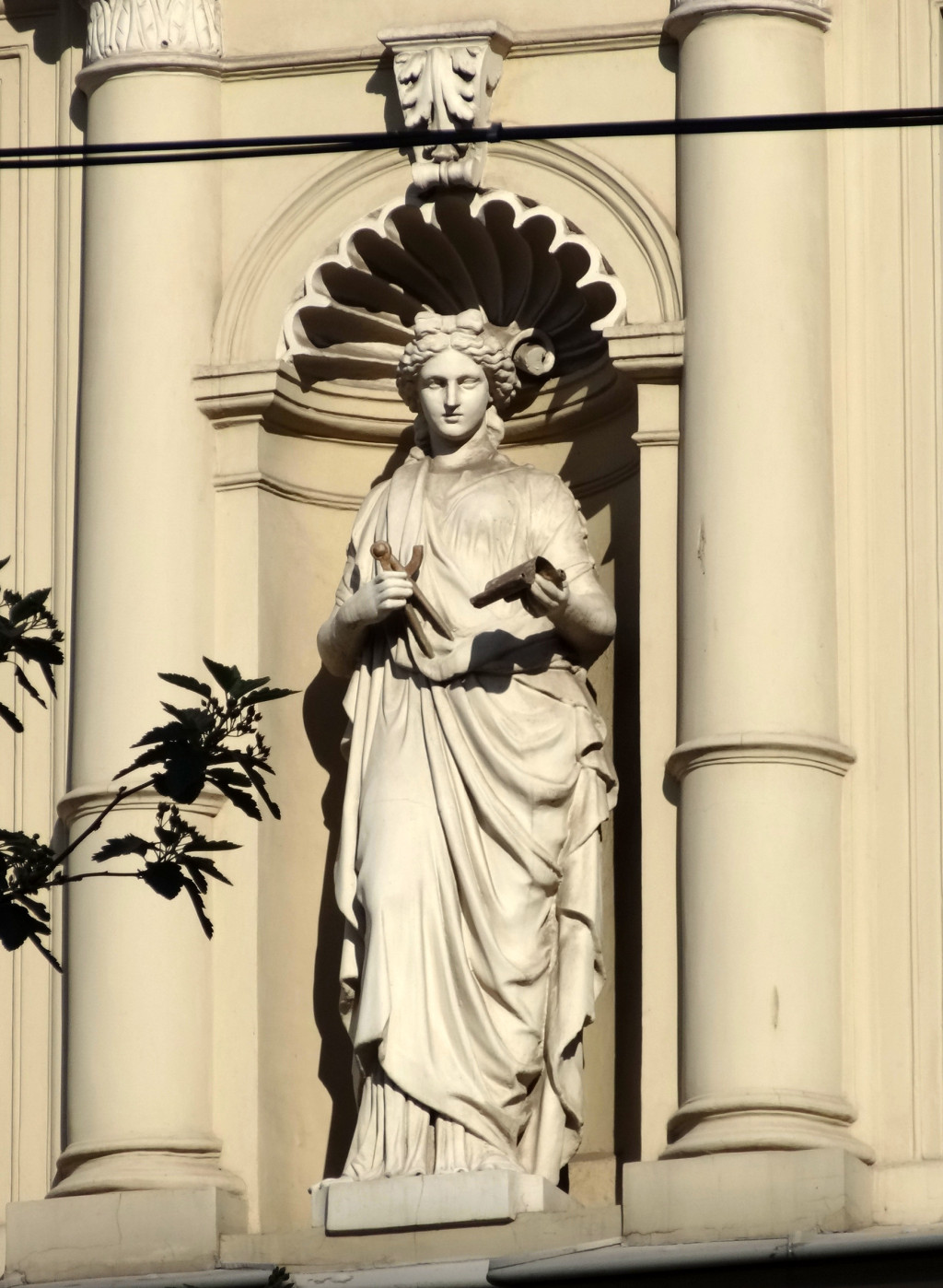
Statued Allegory of Architecture and Construction

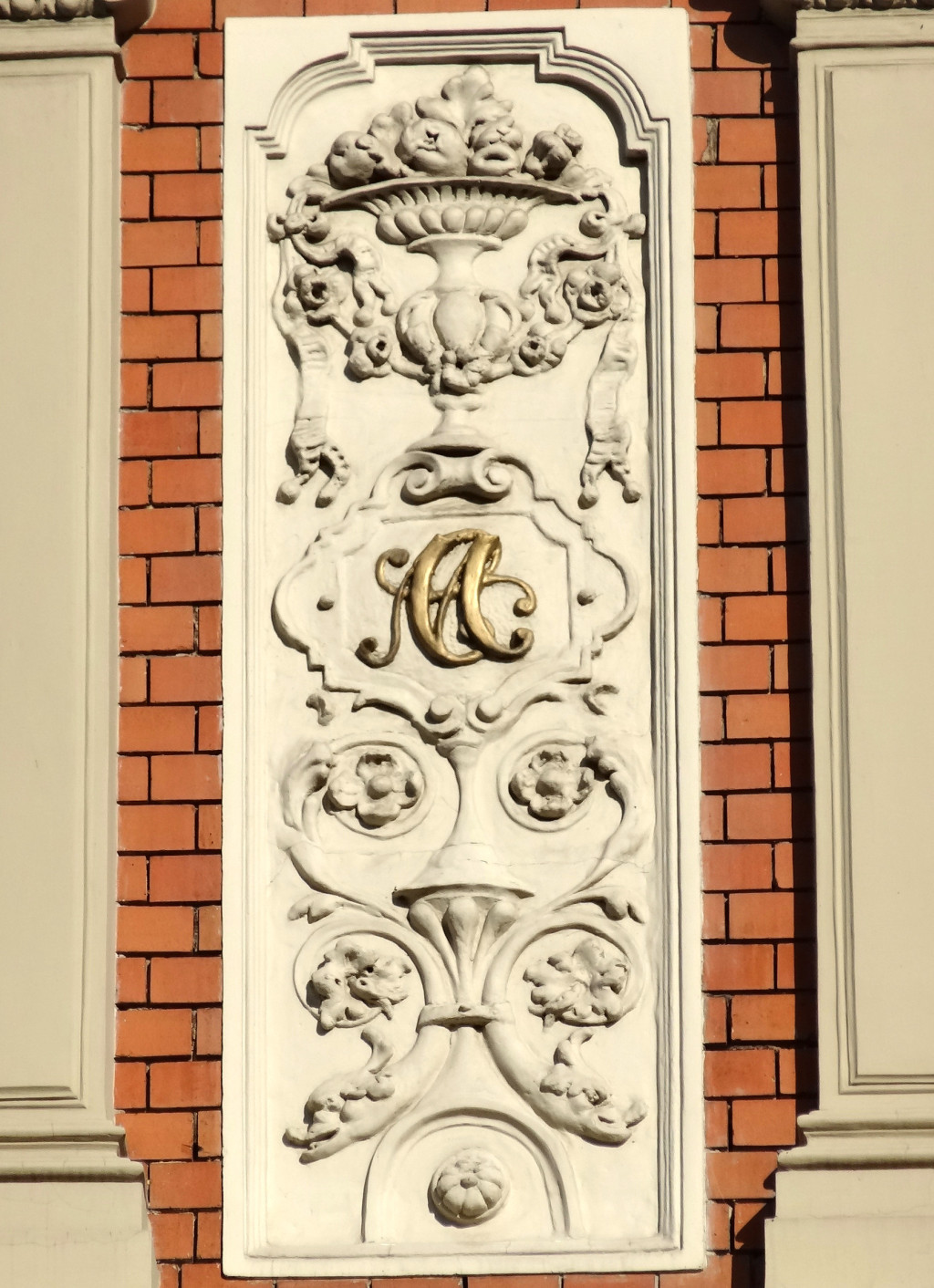
Ornament with "MC" initials

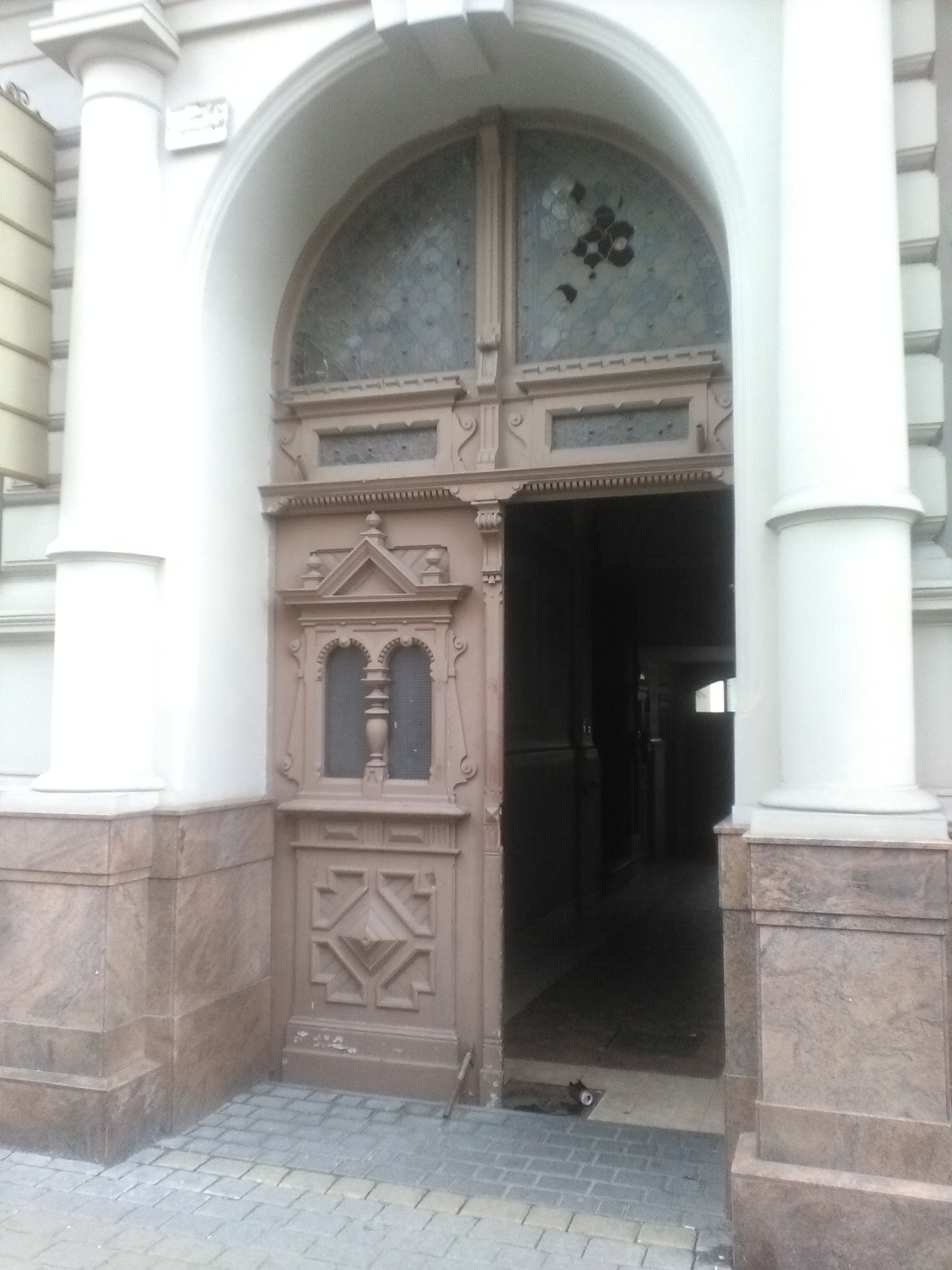
Main portal

== See also ==
- Bydgoszcz
- Gdanska Street in Bydgoszcz
- (in Polish) Carl Meyer
- (in Polish) Downtown district in Bydgoszcz

== Bibliography ==
- (in Polish) Bręczewska-Kulesza Daria, Derkowska-Kostkowska Bogna, Wysocka A. (2003). Ulica Gdańska. Przewodnik historyczny. Bydgoszcz: Wojewódzki Ośrodek Kultury w Bydgoszczy. ISBN 9788386970100.
