= Old water tower of Bydgoszcz =

Historic water tower in Poland

Coordinates: 53°07′10″N 17°59′25″E

Old Water Tower
- Wieża ciśnień
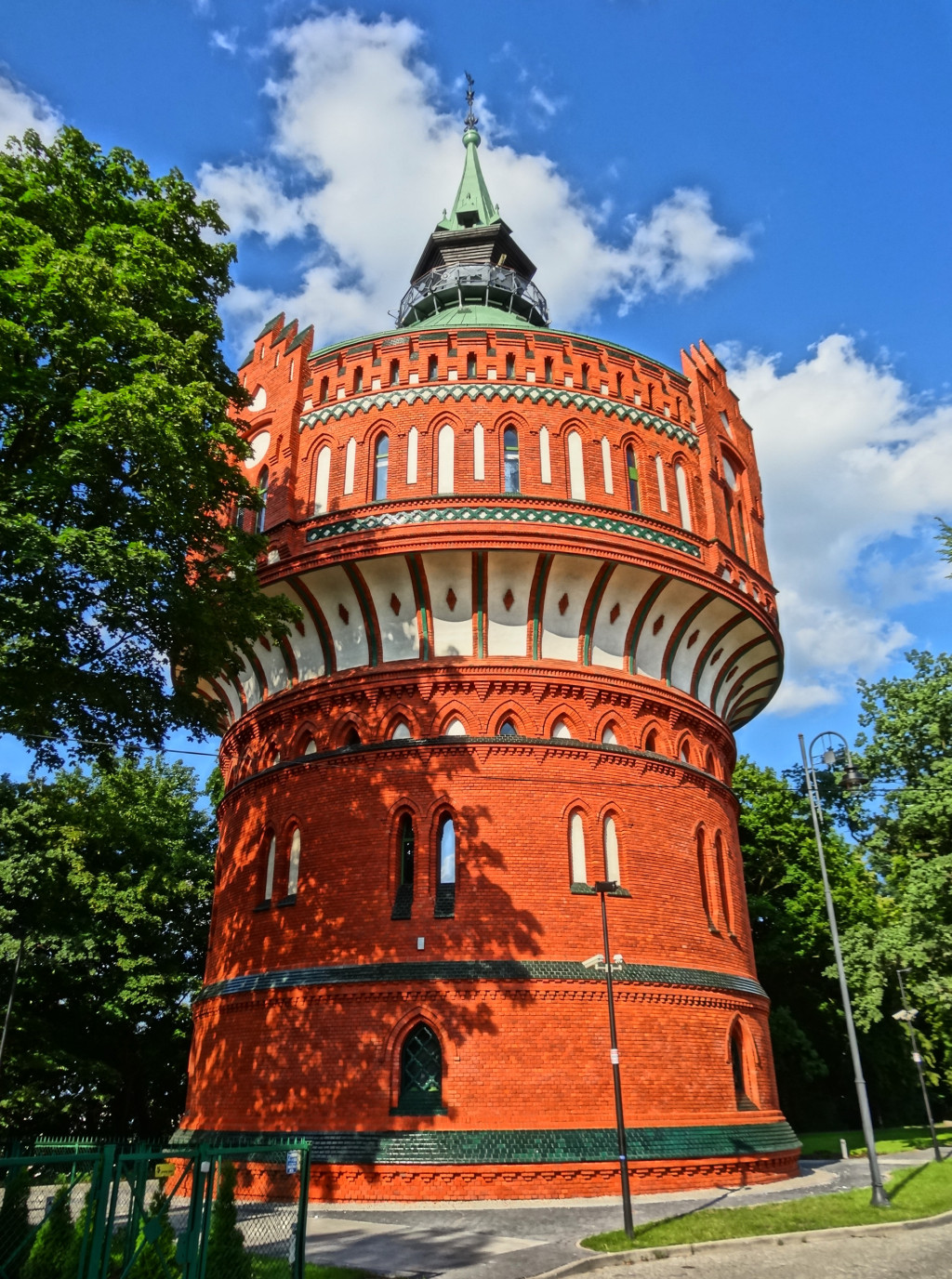
- The old water tower, Bydgoszcz
- Interactive map of the Old Water Tower area

General information
- Type: Water tower
- Architectural style: Neo-Gothic
- Classification: Kuyavian-Pomeranian Voivodeship Heritage List N°601290, A/741, 15 January 1986.
- Location: 2 Filarecka street, Bydgoszcz, Poland
- Completed: 1900
- Owner: Bydgoszcz Waterworks Municipal Company

Height
- Height: 45 metres (148 ft)

Technical details
- Material: Brick

Design and construction
- Architect: Franz Marschall

The old water tower is a historic water tower belonging to the municipal water supply network of Bydgoszcz, Poland. Its importance in the local history has been acknowledged in 1986 by a registering on the Kuyavian-Pomeranian Voivodeship Heritage List.

== Location ==
The tower stands on the southern hills of the city, part of a green park, the municipal Henryk Dąbrowski Park (Polish: Park Henryka Dąbrowskiego w Bydgoszczy). Its formal location is 2 Filarecka street.

== History ==
At the end of the 19th century, following the dramatic economic and demographic development of the city, necessary municipal investments had to be carried out, such as a gasworks plant (1860), horse-powered tram lines (1888), an electrical power plant (1896) and a water supply and sewage network (1890s). Till that time, people could only get water from wooden wells built in the 1880s for city districts away from the Brda river.

In 1881, as Bromberg authorities started working on the design and construction of a new water supply and sewage network, first geological surveys began and a geological map of Bydgoszcz was issued. Specific construction works were carried out between 1898 and 1899, laying down a network of 30 30 kilometres (19 mi) of waterpipe up to the water tower.

In 1900, the city supply system comprised 20 deep wells in the northern municipal forest (Polish: Las Gdański) from which water was pumped out using a gas-driven contraption scheme into the network and the water tower. The network also included a 1,260 cubic metres (330,000 US gal) capacity reservoir with a dual role:

- collecting water during the period of minimum consumption;
- supplementing the network shortages during rush hour.

The present tower was erected from 1899 to 1900, on a design by architect Franz Marshall. The construction work was carried out by the firm Wilhelm Rothe & Cie. The edifice location was chosen with care, on the edge of the city southern hill, overlooking the old town. In 1894, Lewin Louis Aronsohn became the administrator of the tower.

As a matter of fact, thanks to its situation, the tower was also regularly used as a city viewpoint. Before long, a viewing platform was constructed on the conical roof, which could be accessed for a fee of 10 pfennigs in Prussia time, then 10 grosze during interwar.

After WWII, a pumping station was built next to the tower, allowing to supply water to the households on the heights of Bydgoszcz, for the districts of Błonie, Szwederowo, Wzgórze Wolności, Wyżyny, Kapuściska. At that time, the vantage platform ceased to be used, before being finally decommissioned in 1990.

In 1991, a rehabilitation of the building enabled the housing of the Water tower artistic Association (Polish: Stowarzyszenie Artystyczne Wieża Ciśnień), gathering together artists, art historians, critics and other people associated with Bydgoszcz cultural life. The tower became a meeting place for artistic exhibitions and happenings

Today, the tower is the property of Bydgoszcz waterworks municipal company (Polish: Miejskie Wodociągi i Kanalizacja w Bydgoszczy). The firm has renovated and adapted the building for the benefit of the Bydgoszcz Waterworks History Museum (Polish: Muzeum Wodociągów w Bydgoszczy) which opened on 30 October 2012. The monument is now part of an educational trail starting at the historic pump station in the northern municipal forest district. Inside the water tower are exhibited, among others, wooden waterpipes, ancient bathrooms, old toilets furnishings, archival pictures photos and documents. Multimedia kiosks with digitally saved information about city waterworks are also available to visitors.

The entire external building facade has been equipped with an advanced evolving illuminating system. One of the tower level is devoted to temporary exhibitions. The 60 metres (200 ft) high observation gallery has been refitted and enable visitors to enjoy a unique panorama view of Bydgoszcz old town.

== Architecture ==
The water tower has a squat, brick cylindrical body with a strong reminiscence of neo-gothic forms. The tank was located in the top circular bay window. Outside cornices under the bay window and the bay window itself are richly decorated. All the openings display a lanceolate shape, highlighting the gothic inspiration.

The upper part containing the nonextant reservoir boasts high windows, an adorned attic, a pseudo-battlement and running motifs friezes. The gable roof is crowned with a conical roof topped by a ridge turret, enclosed by the round observation deck.

Part of the interior decoration is still visible: walls with wood panelling and colorful stained glass windows.

== Gallery ==
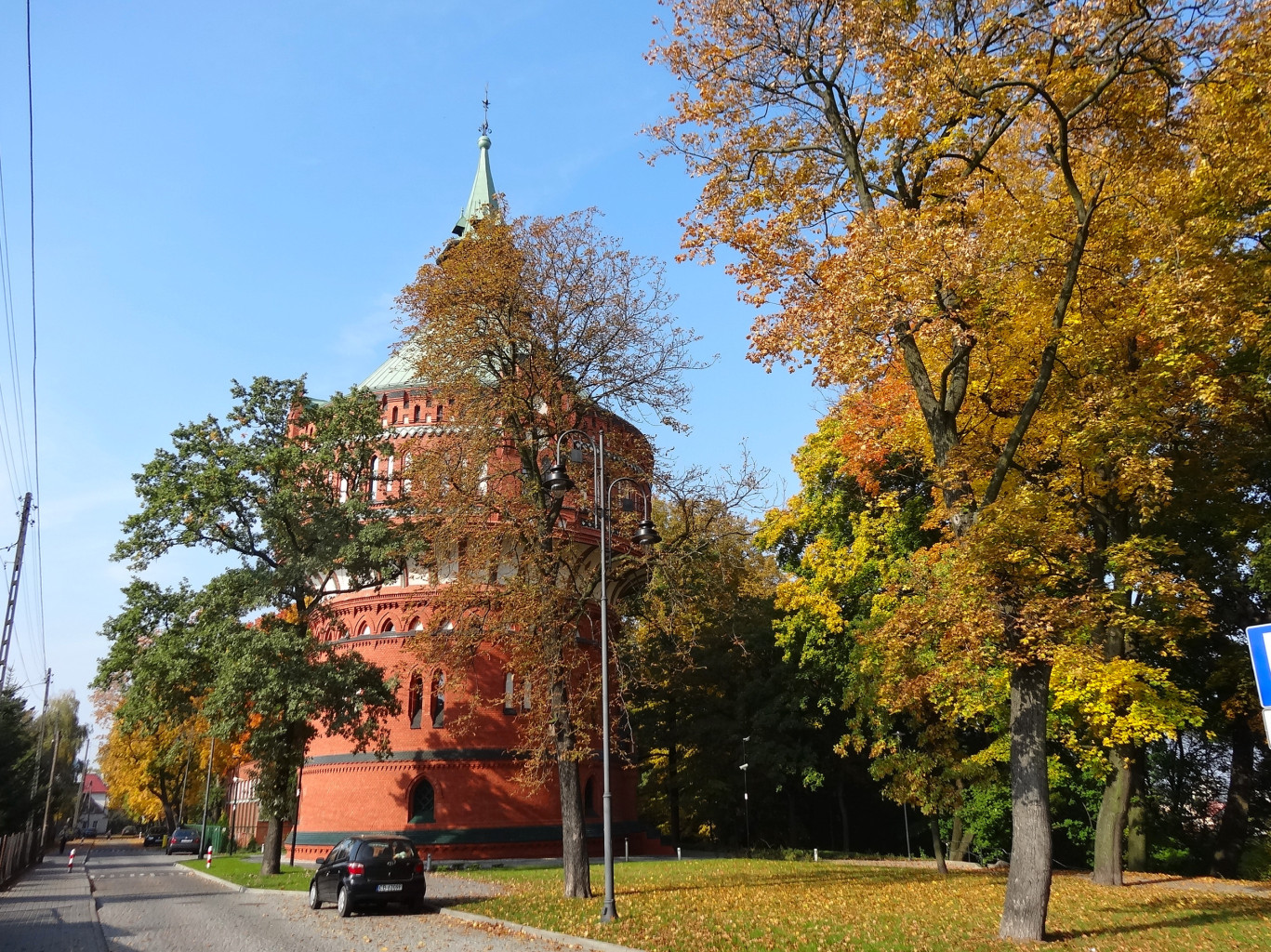
The tower at 2 Filarecka street

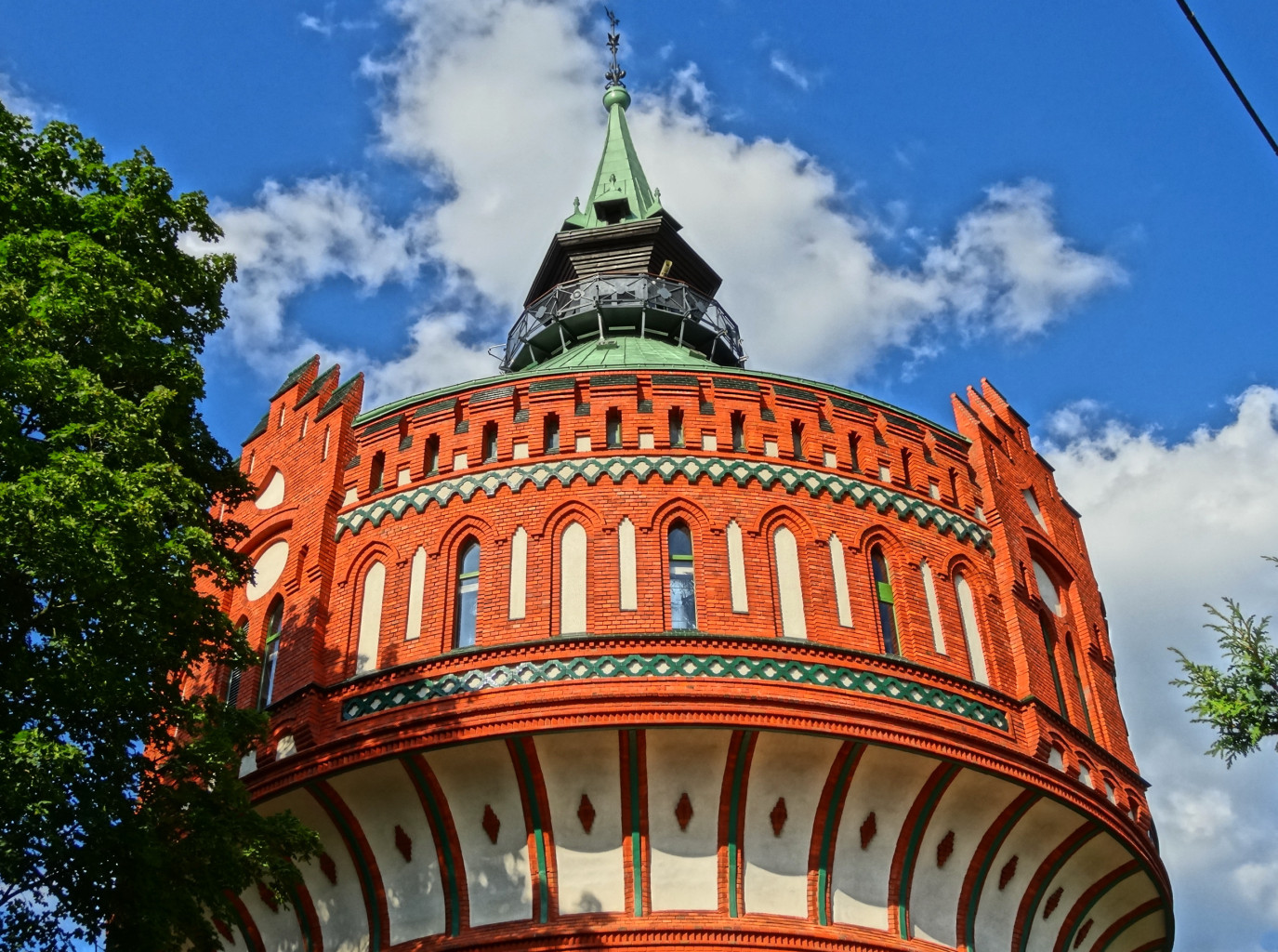
Detail of the reservoir decoration

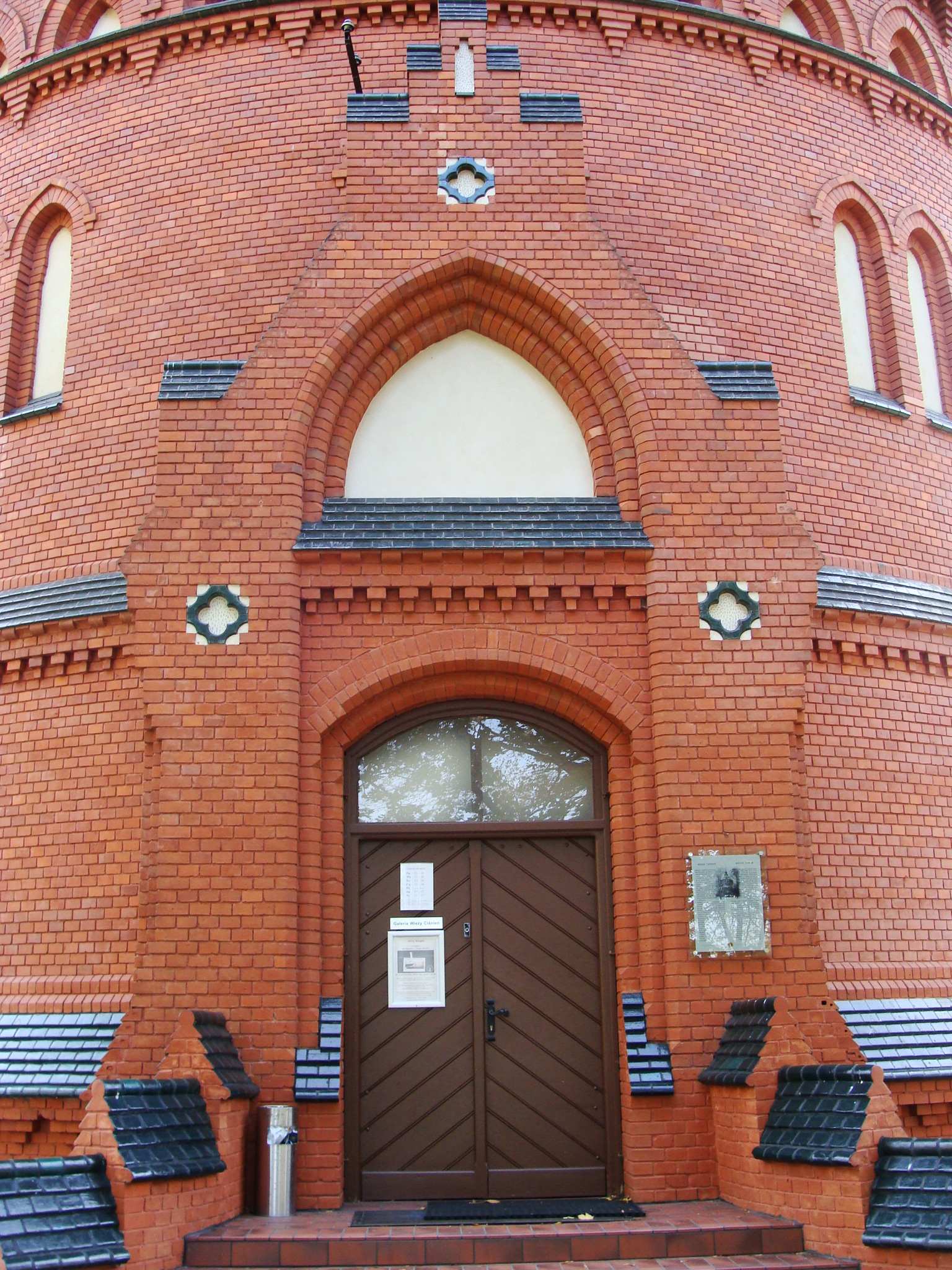
Entrance to the tower

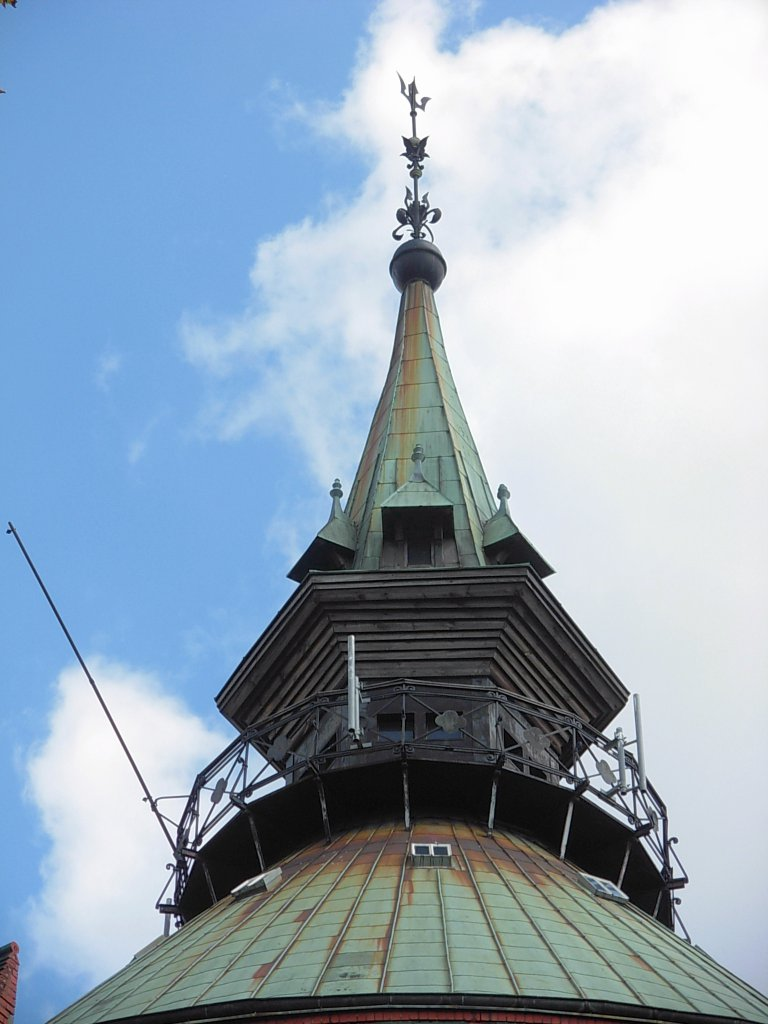
Detail of the ridge turret

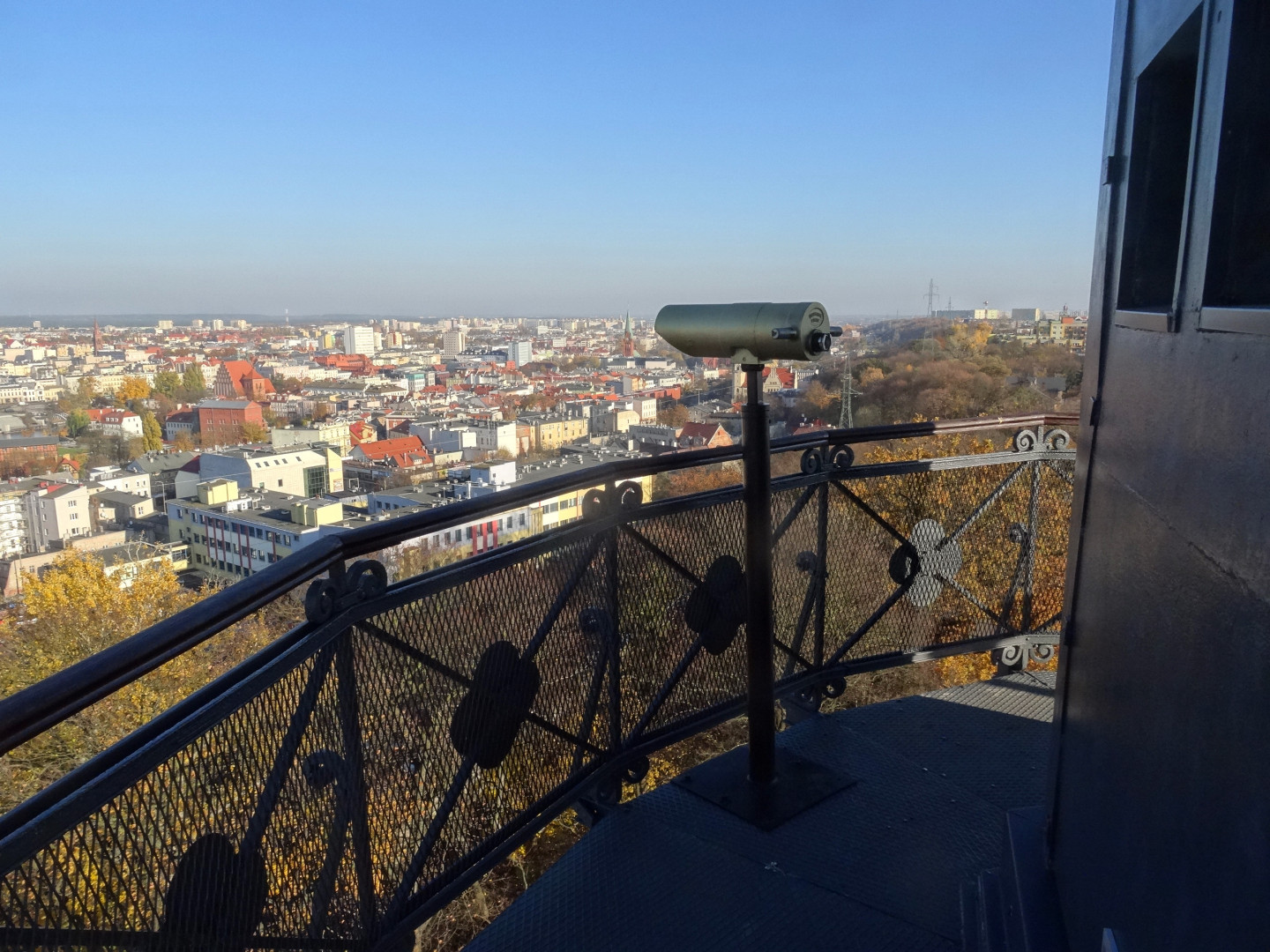
View from the platform

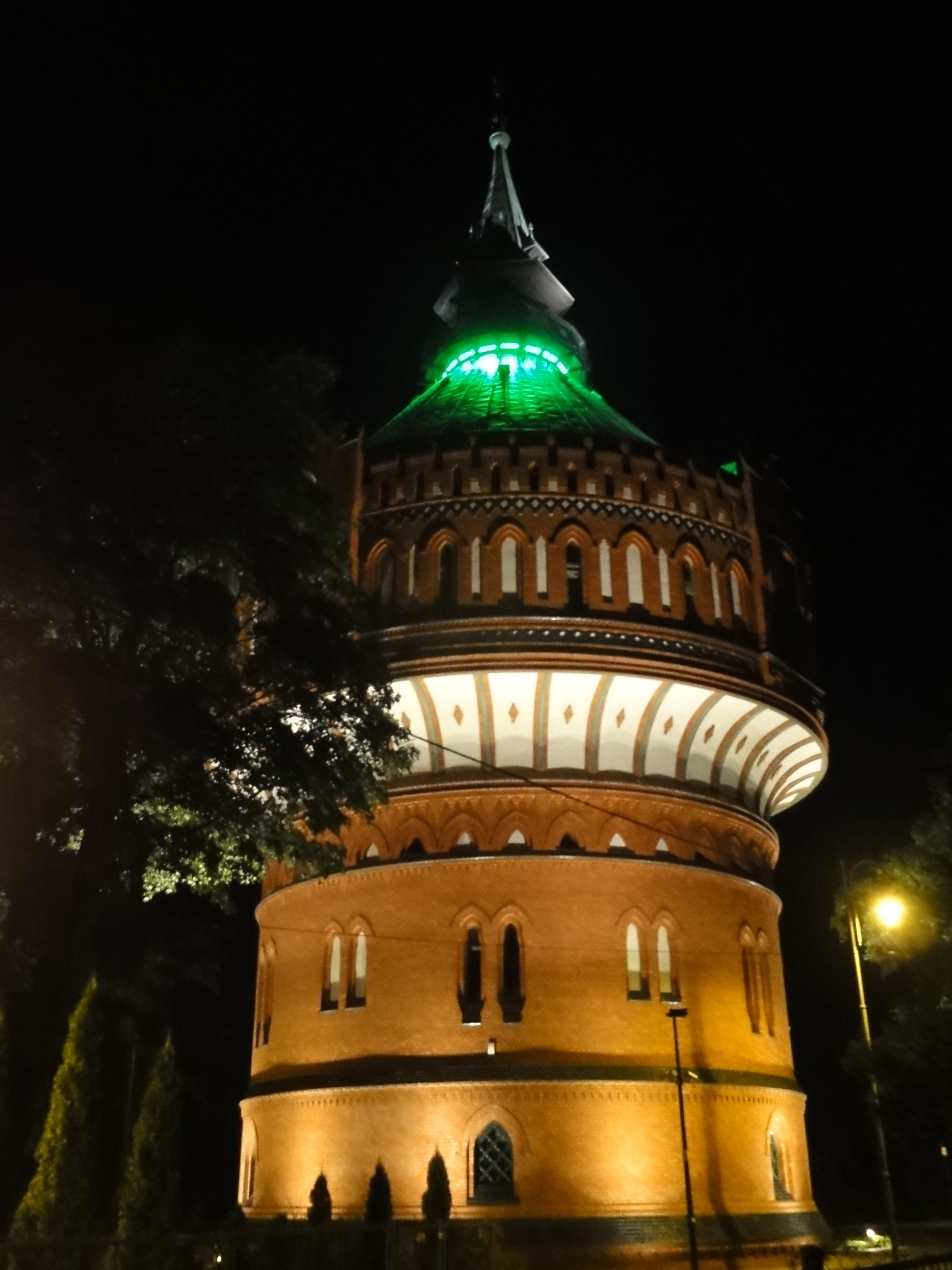
Illuminated tower

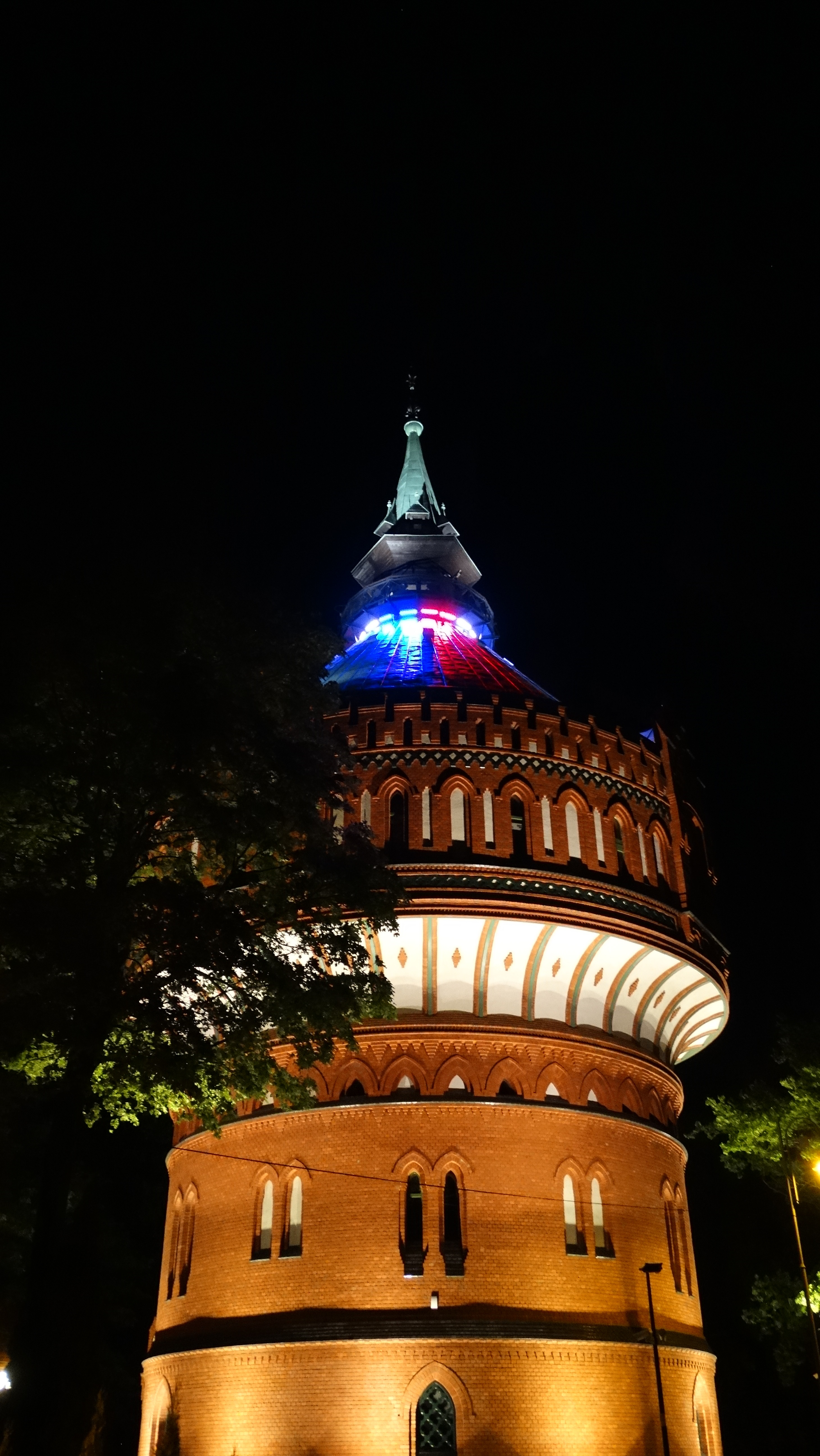
Illuminated tower

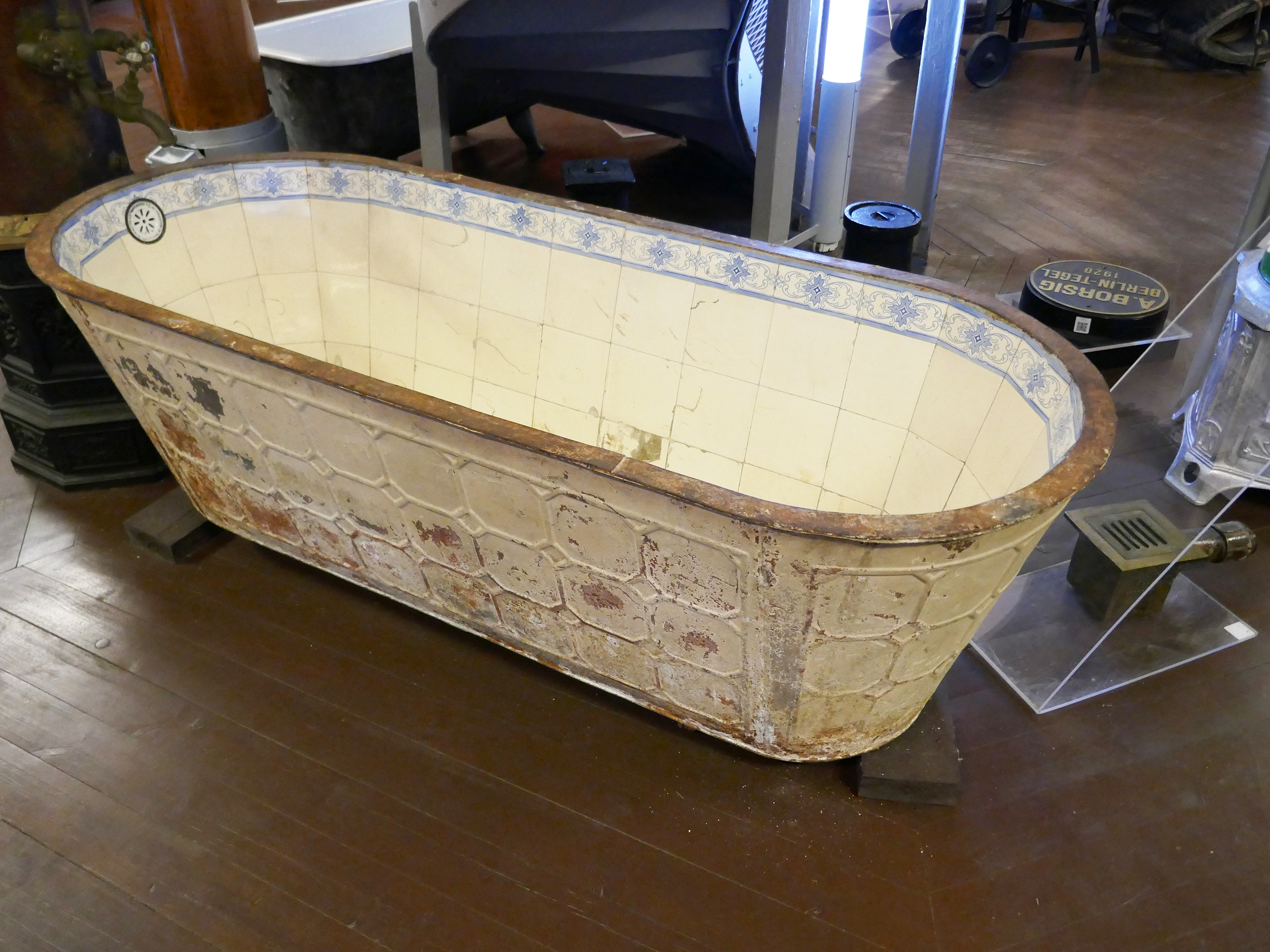
Item exhibited at the museum

== See also ==
- Bydgoszcz
- Las Gdański water supply station, Bydgoszcz

== Bibliography ==
- Pastuszewski, Stefan (1996). Bydgoska Gospodarka Komunalna (in Polish). Bydgoszcz: Instytut Wydawniczy „Świadectwo”. ISBN 83-85860-37-1.
- Czajkowski, Edmund (1983). 460 lat bydgoskich wodociągów. Kalendarz Bydgoski (in Polish). Bydgoszcz: Towarzystwo Miłośników Miasta Bydgoszczy. pp. 149–155. ISBN 8385860371.
- Parucka, Krystyna (2008). Zabytki Bydgoszczy – minikatalog (in Polish). Bydgoszcz: „Tifen” Krystyna Parucka.
- Umiński, Janusz (2004). Bydgoszcz. Przewodnik (in Polish). Bydgoszcz: Wydawnictwo Uczelniane Wyższej Pomorskiej Szkoły Turystyki i Hotelarstwa w Bydgoszczy. ISBN 8391400875.
