= Villa Aronsohn =

Villa Aronsohn in Bydgoszcz
- Polish: Willa Lewina Aronsohna w Bydgoszczy
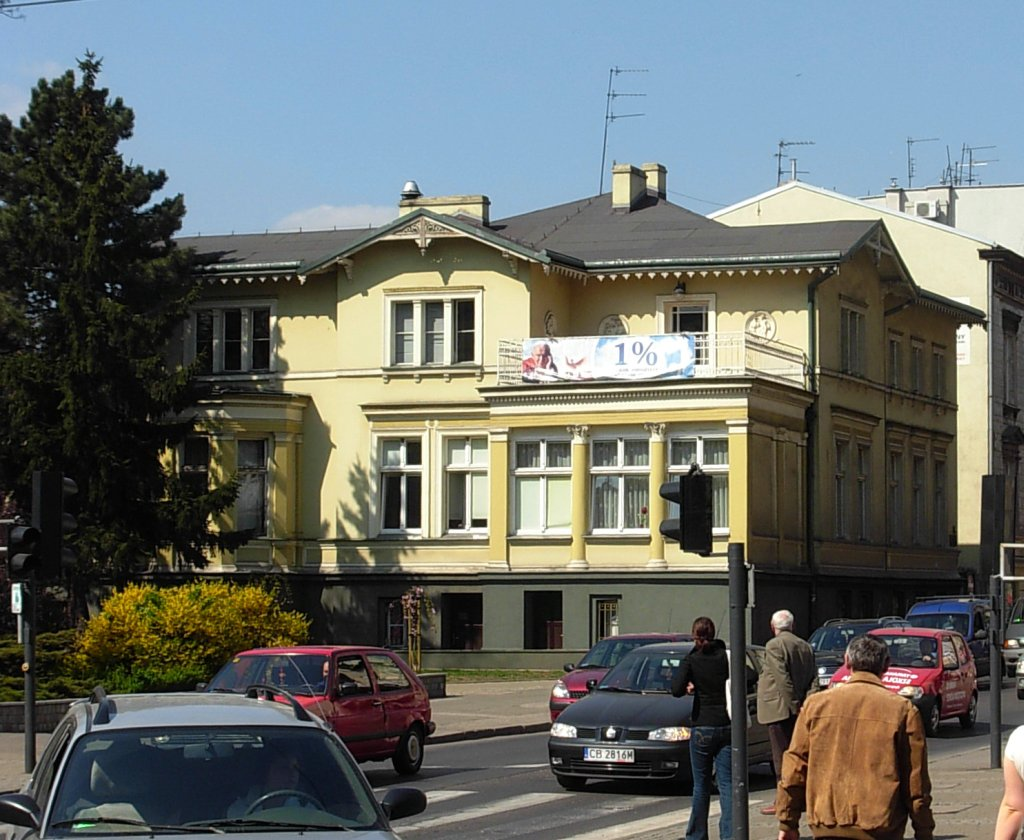
- View from Gdańska street

- Location within Poland

General information
- Type: Villa
- Architectural style: Neo-Renaissance
- Classification: Nr.601416-Reg.A/889, 15 June 1993
- Location: 1 Śniadeckich street, Bydgoszcz, Poland, Poland
- Coordinates: 53°7′42″N 18°0′18″E
- Completed: 1866
- Client: Lewin Louis Aronsohn

The Villa Aronsohn is an historic house in downtown Bydgoszcz, at 1 Śniadeckich street.

== Location ==
The building stands on the corner of Śniadeckich street and Gdańska Street in Bydgoszcz. In the vicinity, stands the memorial of Marian Rejewski.

== History ==
The building was built in the 1860s for Jewish banker Lewin Louis Aronsohn (1850–1928). He was famous in Bromberg as a banker, Jewish active member and politician. As a philanthropist, he donated funds for building an orphanage and funded the work of sculptor Ferdinand Lepcke creating the statue The archer unveiled 18 October 1910, now a symbol of Bydgoszcz. In 1918, Lewin Louis Aronsohn was recognized and praised as Honorary Citizen of Bydgoszcz.

In 1994–1995, the building has been refurbished and since 1995, it houses the seat of the Municipal Housing Administration in Bydgoszcz.(Polish: Administracja Domów Miejskich "ADM").

A recent restoration occurred in January 2016.

== Architecture ==
The villa was built in the Neo-Renaissance style.

It had originally a garden on the southern side. On the eastern facade is located a small terrace, hanging over pilasters. Between the windows two half-columns are supporting the entablature and a decorative frieze. The roof is also adorned with a decorative frieze at the eaves.

Until today, facades have kept tonda with putti reliefs. Inside, rich neo-rococo furnishings can be found: stoves, fireplaces, stuccoes, stained glasses, oak panelling and a wooden coffered ceiling in the office.

The building has been put on the Kuyavian-Pomeranian Voivodeship Heritage List, Nr.601416 Reg.A/889, on 15 June 1993.

== Gallery ==
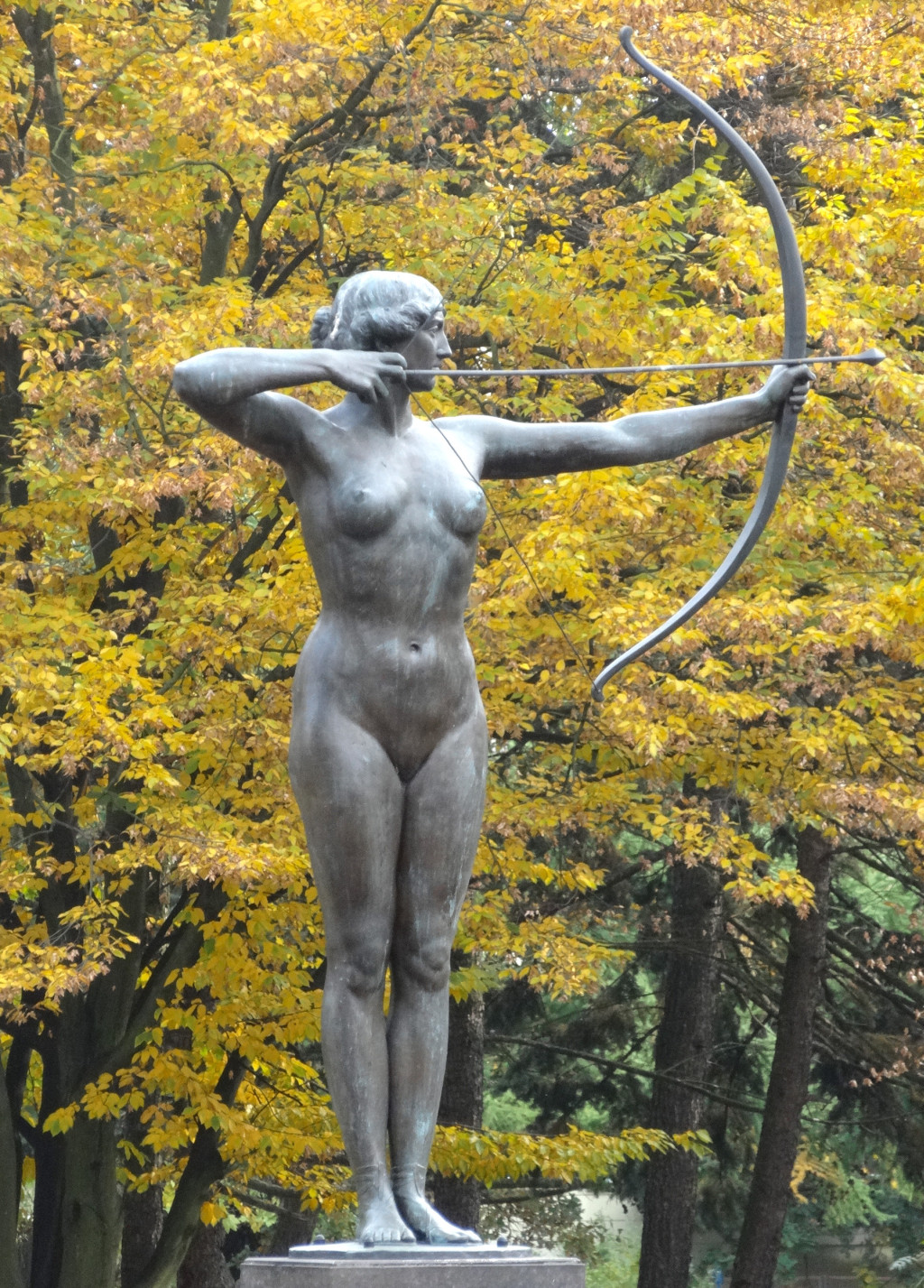
"The archer", by Ferdinand Lepcke, funded by Lewin Louis Aronsohn

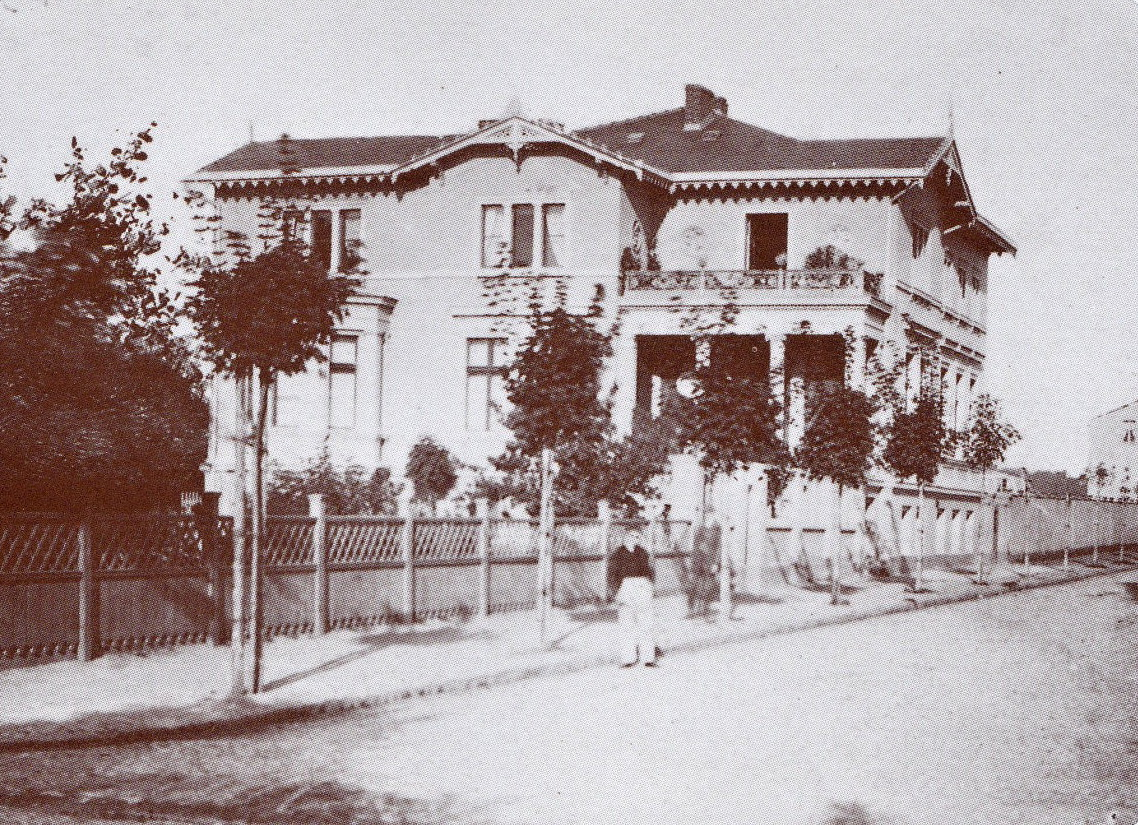
Villa Aronsohn in 1870, Bromberg

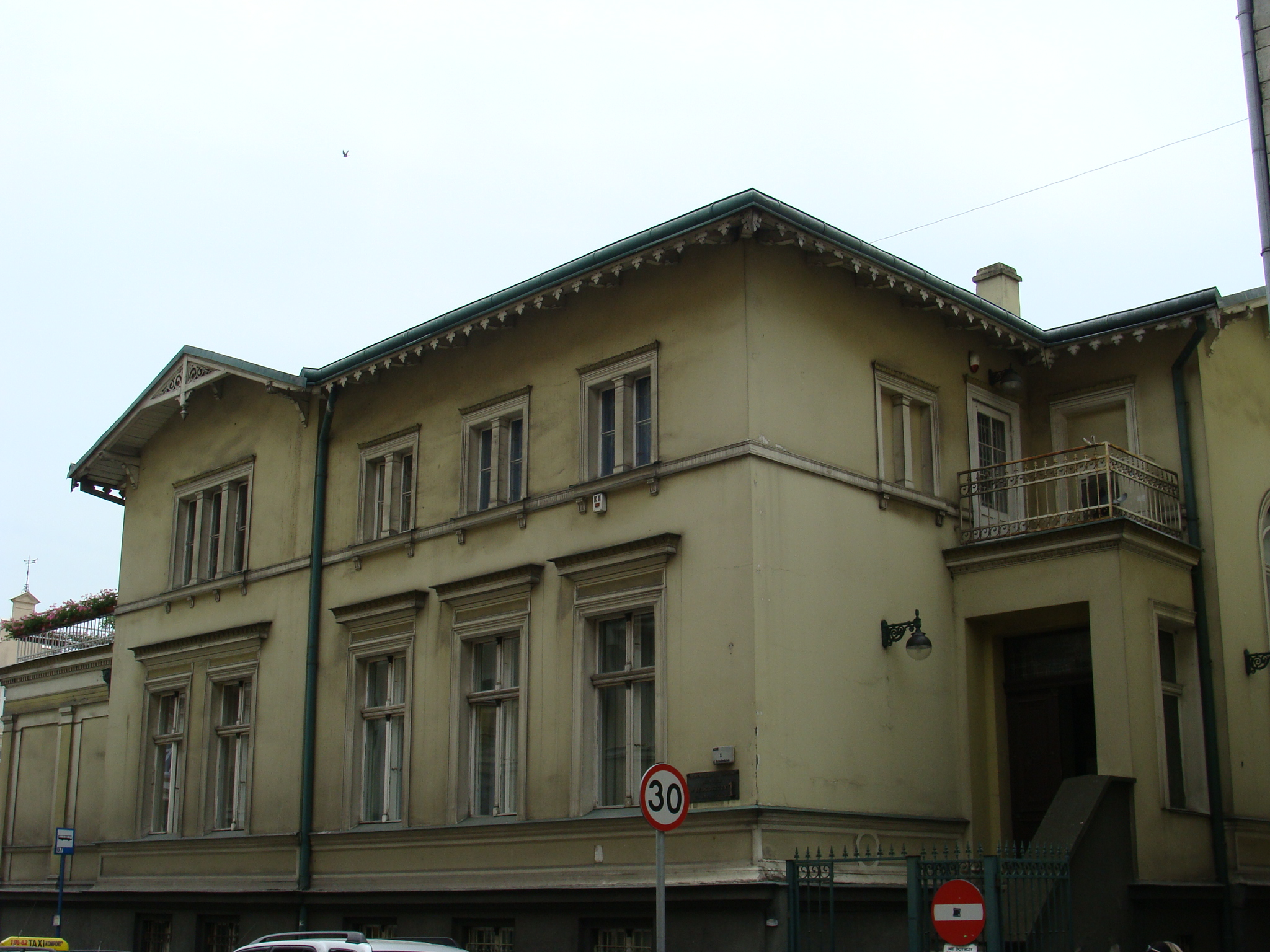
View from Sniadecki Street

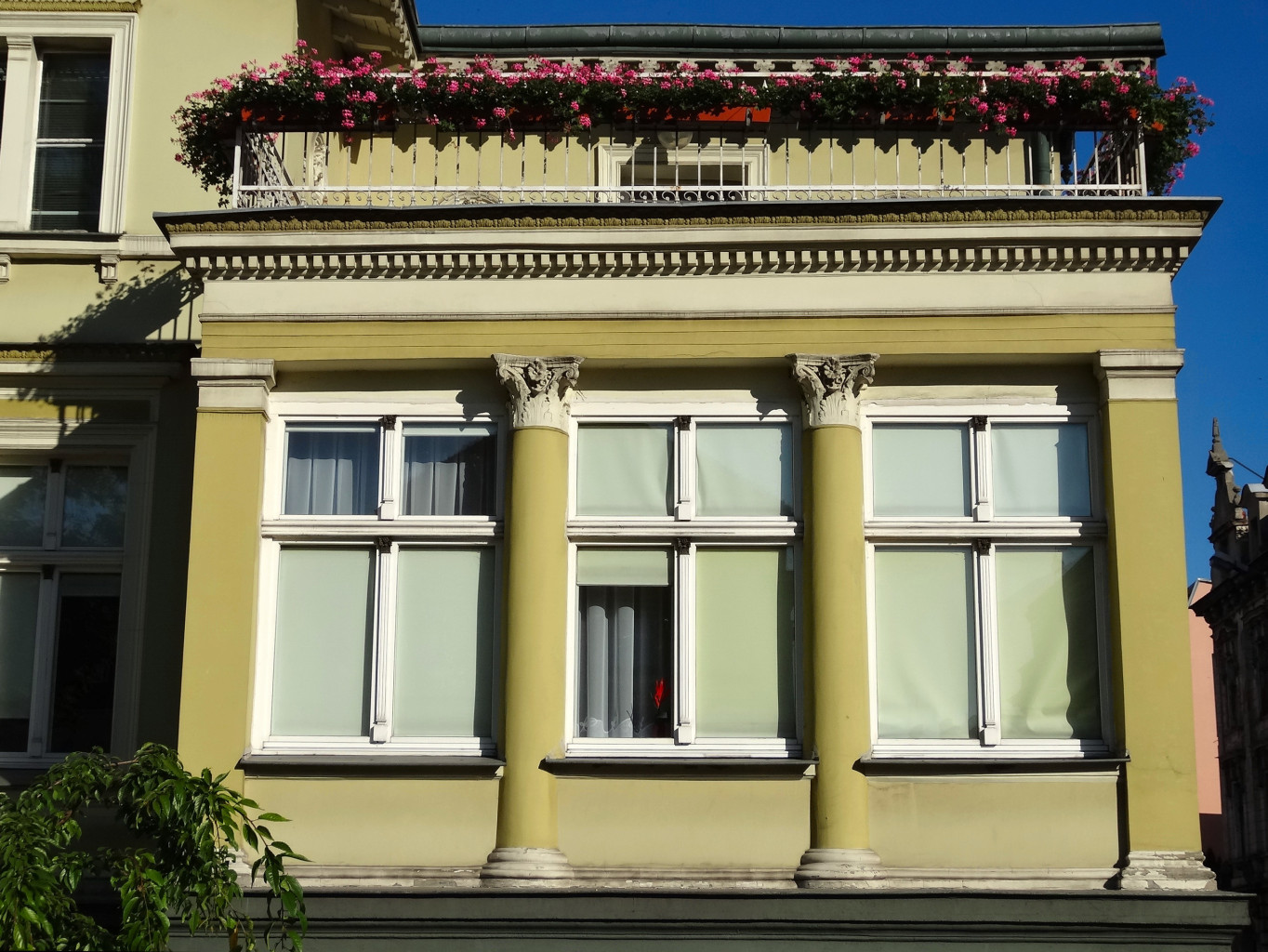
Zoom on the terraced balcony

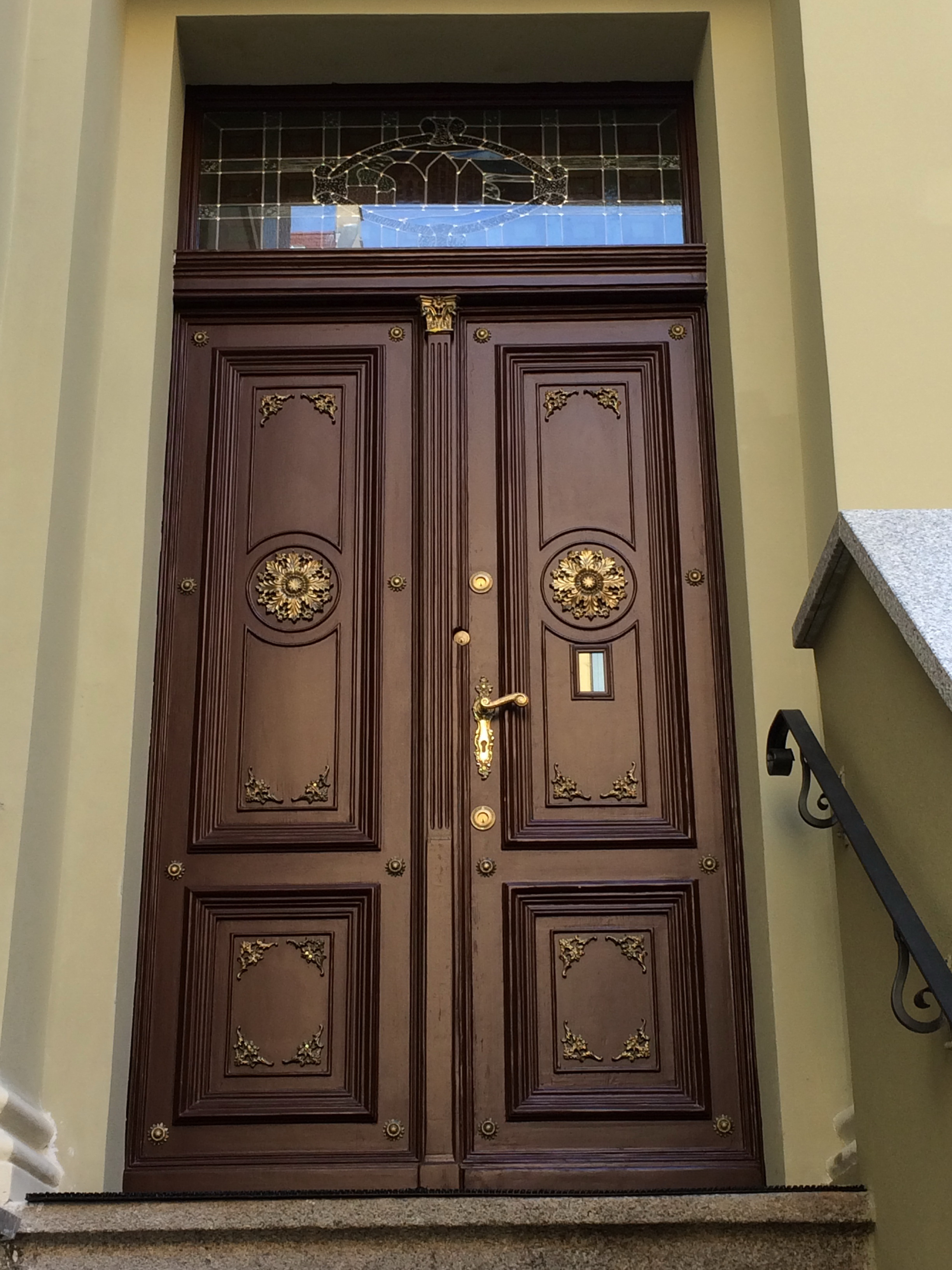
Main gate

== See also ==
- Bydgoszcz
- Lewin Louis Aronsohn
- Jan and Jędrzej Śniadecki Street in Bydgoszcz
- Zygmunt Krasiński Street in Bydgoszcz
- Gdanska Street in Bydgoszcz
- (in Polish) Downtown district in Bydgoszcz

== Bibliography ==
- (in Polish) Bręczewska-Kulesza Daria, Derkowska-Kostkowska Bogna, Wysocka A. (2003). Ulica Gdańska. Przewodnik historyczny. Bydgoszcz: Wojewódzki Ośrodek Kultury w Bydgoszczy. ISBN 9788386970100.
