= Bydgoszcz Synagogue =

Destroyed synagogue in Bydgoszcz, Poland

- Polish: Synagoga w Bydgoszczy
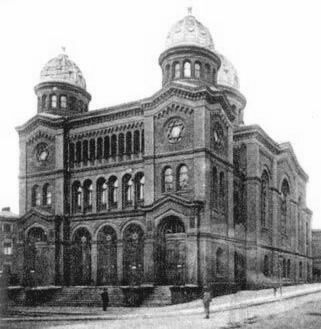
- The former synagogue in 1920

- Location of the destroyed synagogue in Kuyavian–Pomeranian Voivodeship

Religion
- Affiliation: Orthodox Judaism (former)
- Rite: Nusach Ashkenaz
- Ecclesiastical or organizational status: Synagogue (1884–1939)
- Status: Destroyed

Location
- Location: Pod Blankami Street, Bydgoszcz, Kuyavian–Pomeranian Voivodeship
- Country: Poland
- Interactive map of Bydgoszcz Synagogue
- Coordinates: 53°07′14″N 17°59′57″E

Architecture
- Architect: Alfred Muttray
- Type: Synagogue architecture
- Founder: Lewin Louis Aronsohn
- Established: 1809 (as a congregation)
- Completed: 1884
- Destroyed: October 1939
- Dome: Three (maybe more)

The Bydgoszcz Synagogue (Polish: Synagoga w Bydgoszczy) was a former Orthodox Jewish congregation and synagogue, located on Pod Blankami Street, in Bydgoszcz, in the Kuyavian–Pomeranian Voivodeship of Poland. Designed by Alfred Muttrey and completed in 1884 to replace the old wooden synagogue, the synagogue served as a house of prayer until World War II when it was destroyed by Nazis in October 1939.

== History ==
The first recording of Jews settling in Bydgoszc dates from the 11th or 12th-century. However they were expelled in 1955 and were officially allowed to return from 1772, when the former authorization was annulled by Frederick the Great. The congregation in Bydgoszcz was officially established in 1809.

Architect, Alfred Muttrey submitted his design on 27 May 1882, and the construction was initiated by Lewin Louis Aronsohn, and sponsored financially by the entire Jewish community. One of the largest structures in Bydgoszcz until its destruction, the synagogue could accommodate 500 people.

Another former synagogue is located at Przy Bożnicy Street, in the adjacent settlement of Fordon.

== Gallery ==
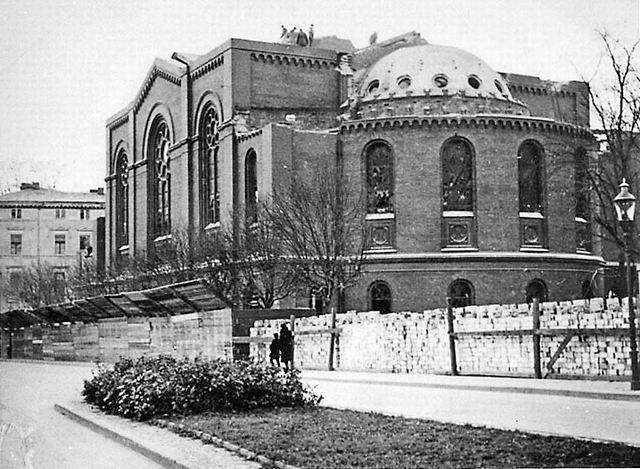
Beginning of the complete deconstruction of the synagogue on Nazi German orders, winter 1939

== See also ==
- History of the Jews in Poland
- List of active synagogues in Poland
