= Aleksander Olszyński Building =

Aleksander Olszyński Tenement
- Polish: Kamienica Aleksandra Olszyńskiego
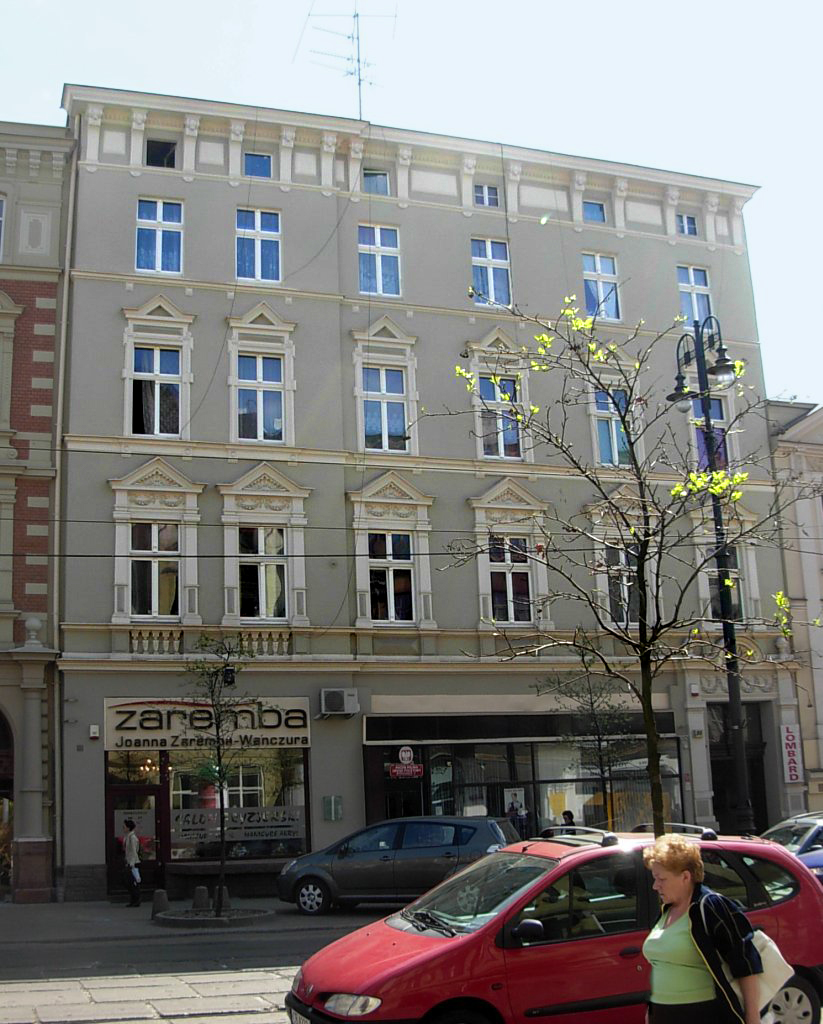
- Tenement at 58 Gdańska Street
- Interactive map of the Aleksander Olszyński Tenement area

General information
- Type: Tenement
- Architectural style: Neo-Renaissance & Neo-Baroque, with Eclecticism style elements
- Location: 58 Gdańska Street, Bydgoszcz, Poland
- Coordinates: 53°7′51″N 18°0′32″E
- Groundbreaking: 1894
- Completed: 1895
- Client: Aleksander Olszyński

Technical details
- Floor count: 4

Design and construction
- Architect: Henrich Arndt

The Aleksander Olszyński Tenement is a habitation house built in the late 19th century from a design by architect Heinrich Arndt in Bydgoszcz, Poland, and located at 58 Gdańska Street.

== Location ==
The building stands on the eastern side of Gdańska Street, between Słowackiego street and Adam Mickiewicz Alley. It is adjacent to the Chapel of the Sisters of the Poor Clares at N.56 and the Carl Meyer tenement at N.60, both Bydgoszcz historical buildings.

== History ==
The building was erected in 1894-1895 for the carpenter Alexander Olszyński, living at this time at 1 Boiestrasse, on a design by Heinrich Arndt, a Bromberg master mason.

In 1910, the ground floor was refurbished by designer Gustav Habermann to accommodate a business venture. Before the outbreak of World War I, the building housed the offices of the "German Association for People's Health in Bydgoszcz".

In the 1920s, Kochańscy Brothers & Kunzle (Polish: Bracia Kochańscy i Künzl) run a jewelry shop in the premises, manufacturing gold and silver products. During the occupation of Poland, the building housed the main store of the Württemberg metal goods factory (German: WMF-Württemberger MetallwarenFabrik).

== Architecture ==
One can still notice preserved and rich, Neo-Renaissance and Neo-Baroque stucco decoration of the facade. Many original forms of the eclectic architectural details are also present, in particular the adorned wooden main door with a transom light.

== Gallery ==
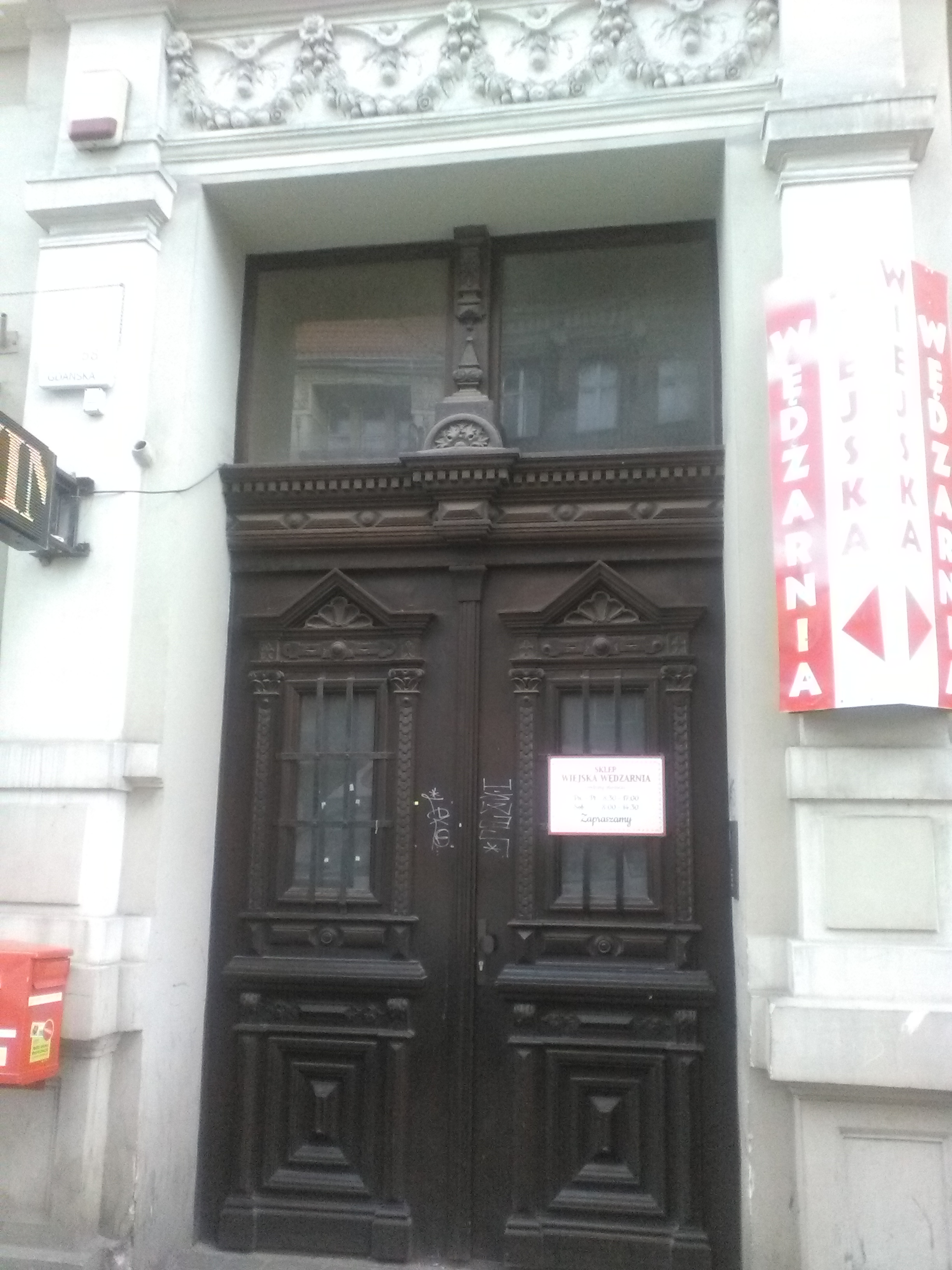
Main door and transom light

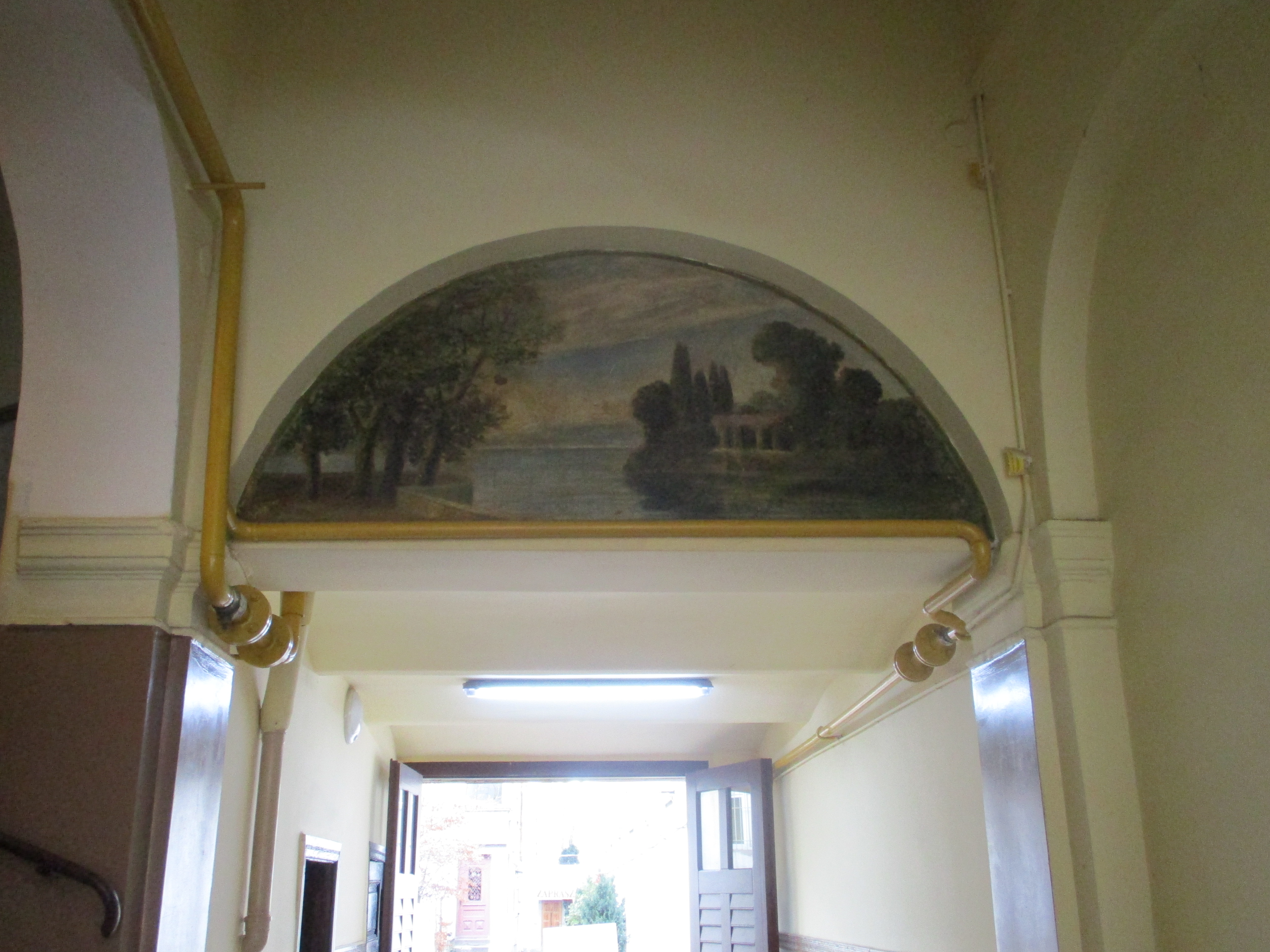
Indoor fresco

== See also ==
- Bydgoszcz
- Gdanska Street in Bydgoszcz
- (in Polish) Downtown district of Bydgoszcz

== Bibliography ==
- (in Polish) Bręczewska-Kulesza Daria, Derkowska-Kostkowska Bogna, Wysocka A. (2003). Ulica Gdańska. Przewodnik historyczny. Bydgoszcz: Wojewódzki Ośrodek Kultury w Bydgoszczy. ISBN 9788386970100.
