= Lewin Louis Aronsohn =

German banker and politician (1850–1928)

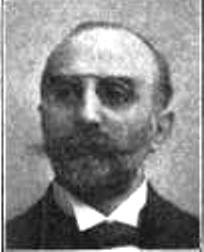
- Louis Aronsohn

Member of the town council of Bromberg
- In office 1878–1890

Member of the magistrate of Bromberg
- In office 1890–1918

Member of the Landtag of the Province of Posen

Member of the Prussian House of Representatives
- In office 1903–1918
- Constituency: Wirsitz (Wyrzysk) – Bromberg, town and district (Bydgoszcz)

Prussian Constitutional Assembly
- In office 1919–1921

Personal details
- Born: 18 October 1850 Wissek, Province of Posen, Prussia (Wysoka, Poland)
- Died: 1928 (aged 77–78) Berlin, Weimar Germany
- Party: Free-minded People's Party (Germany); Progressive People's Party (Germany); German Democratic Party
- Occupation: banker
- Awards

Lewin Louis Aronsohn (1850–1928) was a German banker of Jewish origin. As a liberal politician, he was a member of the regional parliament of the Province of Posen (nowadays Poznań), the Prussian House of Representatives and the Prussian Constitutional Assembly. In 1918, he has been given the title of Honorary Citizen of Bydgoszcz.

== Life ==
Louis Aronsohn was born on 18 October 1850 in Wissek (today's Wysoka) then in the Province of Posen (today's Piła County). He was the son of Hirsch Aronsohn and Julianna née Kleszewska. His father was a land trader while managing the family estate of Mamlicz, near Żnin.

The Aronsohn family came to Bromberg (Bydgoszcz) in 1864. Here, Lewin Aronsohn attended primary school and then a vocational school. Afterwards, Louis worked at his father's side and learned the business of real estate. When his father died in 1876, he inherited the Mamlicz estate and his father's capital, and started yield a profit out of it.

In Bydgoszcz, Louis and his family lived successively at:

- 8 Gdańska street (non existent);
- 64 Jagiellońska street;
- 1 Śniadeckich street, then Elisabethstraße 2, from 1873 on. Bought initially by his father Hirsch, it is now called "Villa Aronsohn".

=== Local government ===
In 1878, at the age of 28, Lewis entered the City Council and remained its member continuously until 1890. He was also appointed to the magistrate as an unpaid councillor and kept the position till 18 October 1918, when he resigned from the office and left his municipal functions.

During this 40-year period, Aronsohn hold various seats as an administration officials in the city administration. His activities were related to several domains:

- assessment and collection of local government taxes (1890-1891);
- management of the municipal gasworks (1890-1893) at today's 42 Jagiellońska Street;
- supervision of the market and the City Slaughterhouse (1894-1918), also in Jagiellońska Street (then Wilhelmstraße);
- control of municipal real estate transactions (1903-1910);
- administrator of the water tower (from 1894);
- curator of the municipal depository (1897-1899).

Furthermore, in 1910, he supervised the matters of the maintenance of the city sluices, newly acquired by the local authorities.

Louis Aronsohn initiated of the creation of a high-level commercial school in Bromberg/Bydgoszcz. To this end, he negotiated with the president of the government regiony, Christoph von Tiedemann, gaining his support.

On 29 December 1899 he received the rank of "commercial counselor" and was promoted to "secret commercial counsellor" on 8 January 1908.

=== Political activity ===
In the political arena, Aronsohn joined the Free-thinking People's Party (German: Freisinnige Volkspartei): he chaired its local city club. Under the "Freisinnige Volkspartei" flag, he successfully participated in the elections for the Prussian House of Representatives in 1903, 1908 and 1913, as a representative of the Bydgoszcz-Wyrzysk district. In 1910, he joined the nascent Progressive People's Party.

He had been regularly criticizing the policy of the Prussian Settlement Commission, which bought Polish estates in the Provinces of Posen and West Prussia: from his point of view, this scheme provided Poles the financial means to settle in towns. In April 1914, he unsuccessfully suggested to use a restrictive clause for the government aid of home ownership in order to exclude Poles from the funding.

His Jewish origin was often looked down at by the national liberals.

=== Business activities ===
In 1892, Lewin Aronsohn founded the "Bank M. Stadthagen", which soon became one of the most successful bank in the city. As a financier and banker, he enjoyed the reputation of a brilliant and capable businessman. Thanks to his network, he could find support for projects among the bankers in Berlin, Königsberg and even from his connections at the Reichsbank.

From 1880 onwards, he was a member of the board of the "Bydgoszcz Chamber of Commerce". In 1891, he was elected as its deputy chairman and in 1915, he became the last chairman of the association, until 1918.

Aronsohn was also the founder, on 29 August 1891, of the Bromberger Schleppschiffahrt Aktien Gesellschaft, future Bydgoszcz Shipping and Towing joint-stock Company (today "Żegluga Bydgoska"). The main shareholders were: Louis, Heinrich Dietz and other city councilors (Fritz Kleindienst, Karl Wenzel and Emil Werckmeister). He was also a member of the supervisory board of the company.

=== Social and culture ===
In 1881, Aronsohn became the chairman of the Jewish religious community in Bromberg. As such, he reinvigorated the construction project of a new synagogue in the city: the foundation stone was laid on 21 October 1882 and the edifice was solemnly consecrated on 9 September 1884.

In the same year, he entered the local Riflemen's Association; in 1903, he was its senior member.

Furthermore, Louis participated to other associations:

- the Historical Society of the Netze District (1885);
- the treasurer of the board of the "German Society of Art and Science in Bydgoszcz" (Polish: Niemieckie Towarzystwo Sztuki i Nauki w Bydgoszczy), from 1 December 1902.

He was active in projects dealing with very diverse domains: natural science, art, singing, engineering or literature.

=== Philanthropy ===
His considerable fortune enabled Aronsohn to engage in philanthropic activities.

He donated a plot of land to the city for the construction of a care and education facility for small children, (German: "Kleinkinderbewahranstalt") completed in 1910.

He financed the construction of the monument to German Emperor William I, which stood on Plac Wolności till 1919.

He additionally founded the monument "The Archer", designed by Ferdinand Lepcke: it was unveiled on 18 October 1910, his 60th birthday. It is now one of the symbols of Bydgoszcz.

Aronsohn's last donation to the city amounted to German Mark 100,000: it was intended to cover the costs of building an indoor swimming pool. However, the project was never implemented, due to the end of WWI and the consequent return of Bydgoszcz to the newly independent Polish territory.

=== Last years ===
On 23 May 1918 Aronsohn left Bydgoszcz and settled in the Weimar Republic, as he opposed the incorporation of Bromberg into Poland. In 1919, he was elected a member of the Prussian National Assembly for the German Democratic Party.

He died in Berlin in 1928.

The "Villa Aronsohn", preserved to this day, is the seat of the Municipal Housing Administration in Bydgoszcz.

== Family ==
In 1875, Lewin Louis Aronsohn married Doris née Bresch, Doris Zieliński by her first marriage.

They had one daughter, Julia, born in 1876 in Bydgoszcz. She married Mr. Meyer and moved to Aachen on 2 May 1899.

== Awards and commemoration ==
- Order of the Red Eagle, 4th Class (1902);
- Order of the Crown (Prussia) 3rd Class (1912);
- On 17 October 1918 the city council of Bromberg passed a resolution on granting Lewin Louis Aronsohn the title of Honorary Citizen of the City. For him, it was the culmination of nearly 40 years of work for his town. Aronsohn was the last person to be given such a title during the Prussian history of Bydgoszcz.

Since its thorough restoration in 1995, the "Villa Aronsohn" has been housing the seat of the Municipal Housing Administration in Bydgoszcz (Polish: Administracja Domów Miejskich "ADM").

== Gallery ==
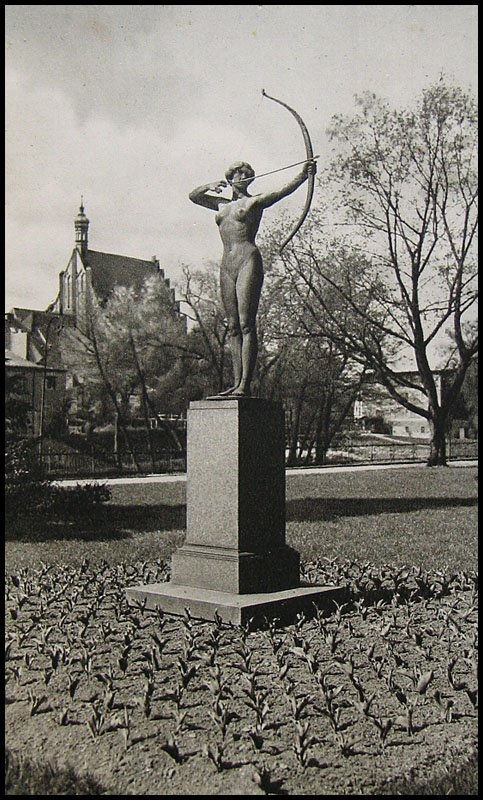
The Archer (1920)

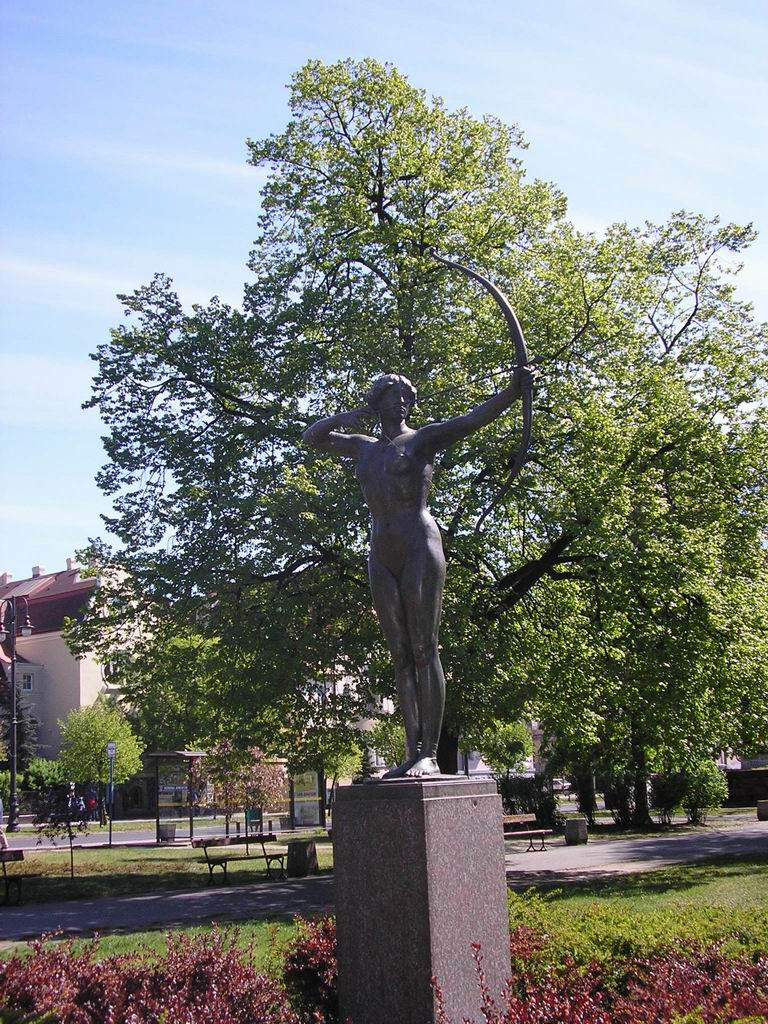
The Archer (current location in Bydgoszcz)

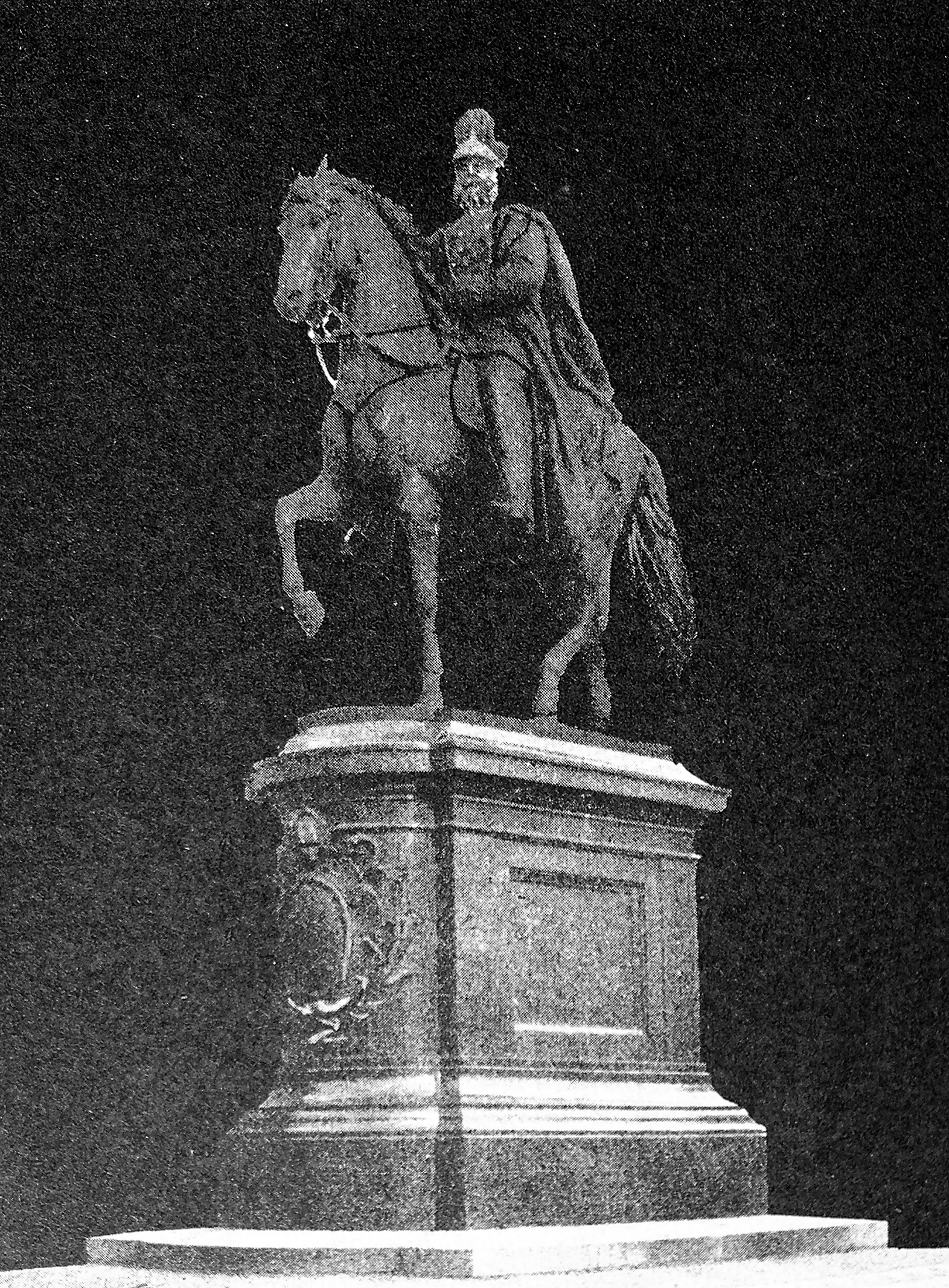
Monument to Kaiser Wilhelm I (destroyed)

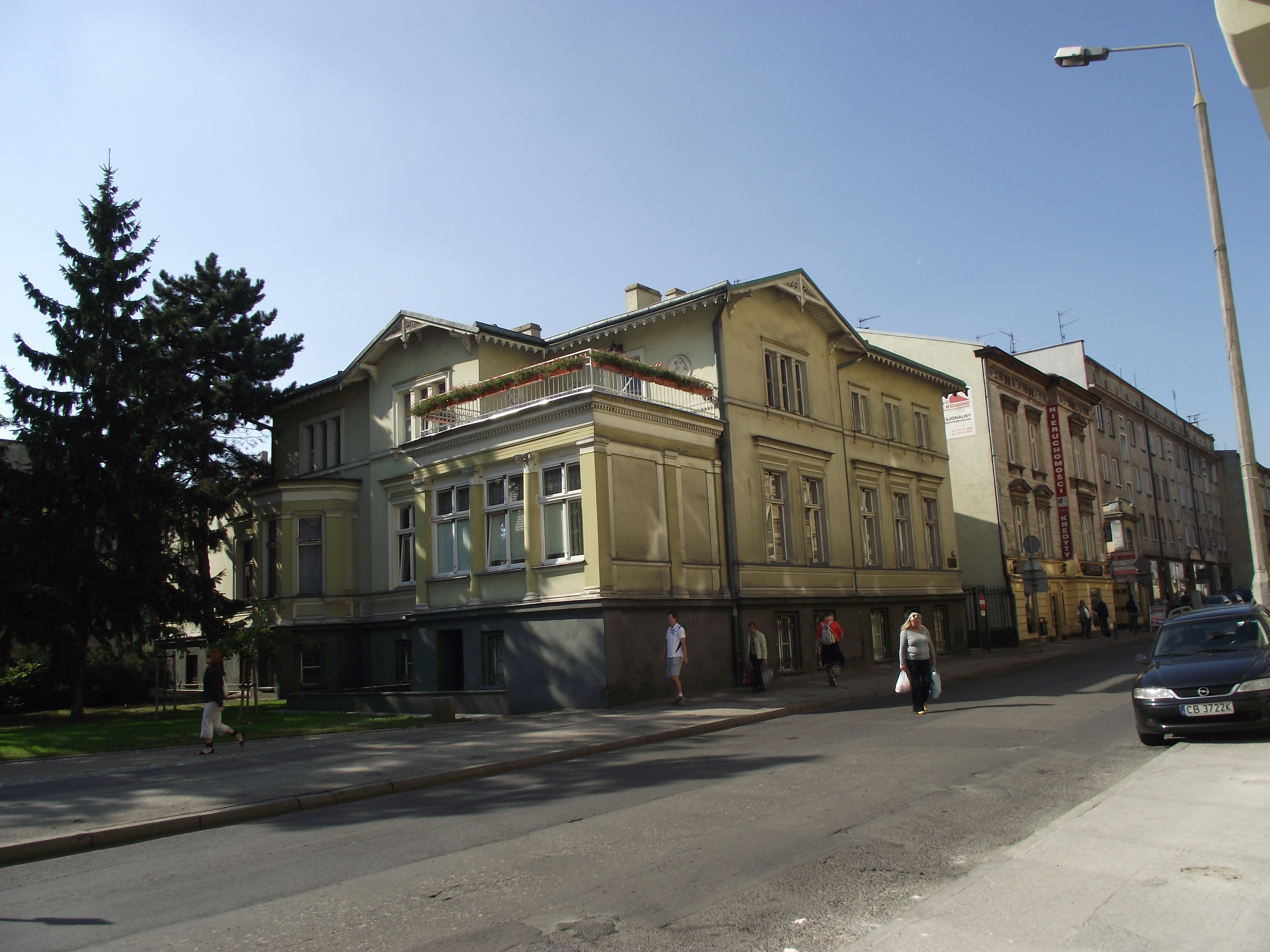
Villa Aronsohn today

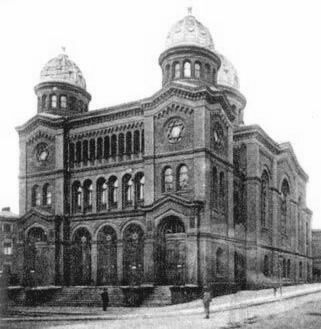
Bromberg Synagogue

== See also ==
- Bydgoszcz
- Villa Aronsohn
- Żegluga Bydgoska
- Bydgoszcz Synagogue
- Statue "The Archer"

== Bibliography ==
- (in Polish) Błażejewski, Stanisław; Kutta, Janusz; Romaniuk, Marek (1994). Bydgoski Słownik Biograficzny. Tom I. Bydgoszcz: Kujawsko-Pomorskie Towarzystwo Kulturalne. pp. 19–20.
