= Las Gdański water supply station, Bydgoszcz =

Water Supply Station "Las Gdański"
- Polish: Stacja wodociągów Las Gdański w Bydgoszczy
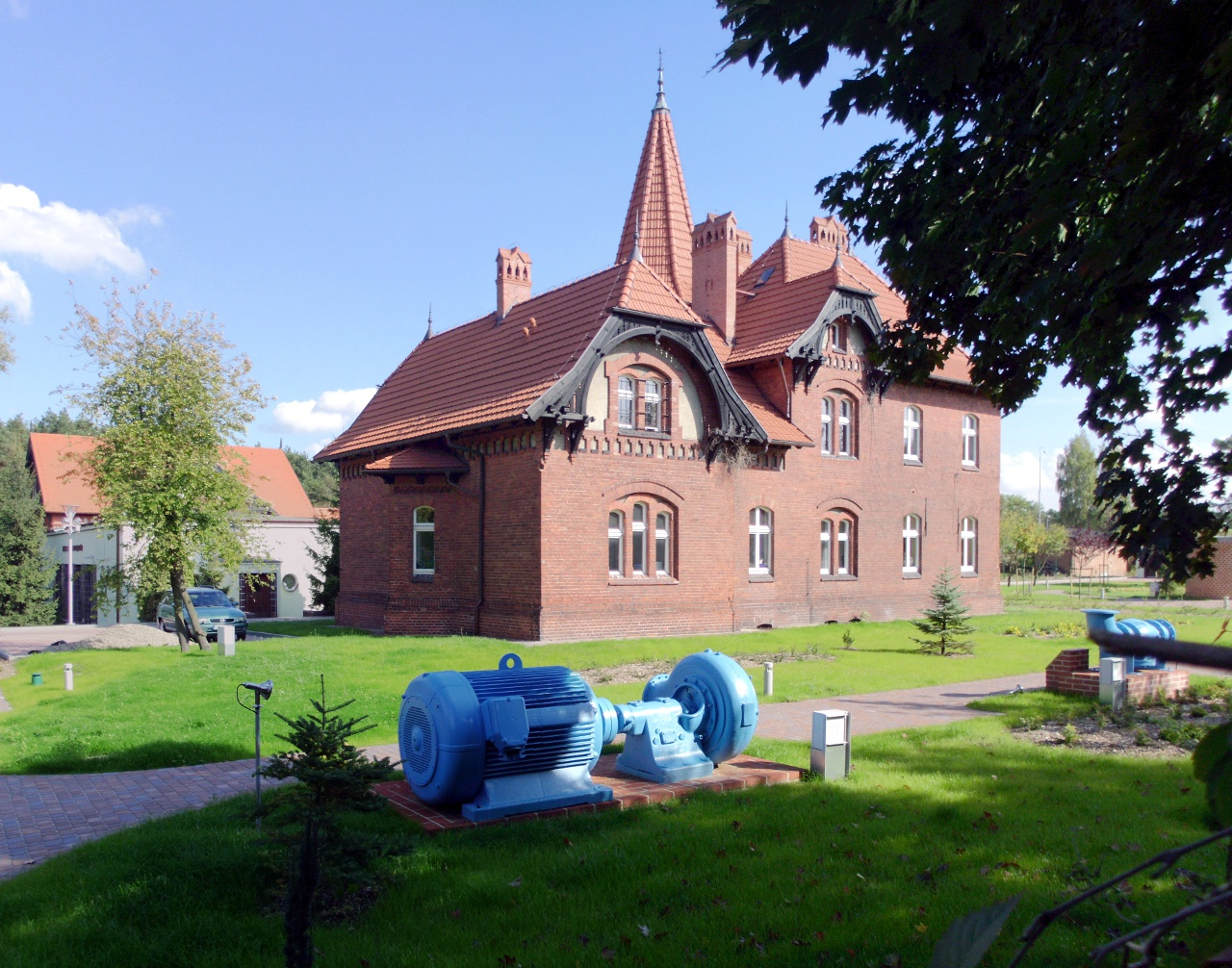
- View from Gdanska street
- Interactive map of the Water Supply Station "Las Gdański" area

General information
- Type: Water pumping station
- Architectural style: Neo-Gothic
- Classification: Nr.601332-Reg.A/812/1-5, 4 November 1992
- Location: 242 Gdańska street, Bydgoszcz, Poland, Poland
- Coordinates: 53°8′54″N 18°1′38″E
- Completed: 1900
- Owner: City of Bydgoszcz

Design and construction
- Architect: F. Marschall

The building stands on the southern edge of the Gdansk Forest area of Bydgoszcz. It is a municipal building pumping underground water since 1900s. The ensemble is registered on the Kuyavian-Pomeranian Voivodeship Heritage List.

== Location ==
The station is located on the eastern side of Gdanska Street, in the district of the Forest of Gdansk (Polish: Las Gdański).

== History ==
At the end of the 19th century (1881), Bromberg authorities commissioned the construction of a municipal water supply and sewage system in the city. The goal was to collect groundwater dating from Quaternary period.

First projects by engineer Theodor Wulf approved in 1890 comprised a complex of buildings that included in water supply systems. The high cost of this investment, covered by government's credits, led to several years of delay. It is only in 1899 that another project, submitted by architect Marshall, had been approved. The construction started the same year, the work being completed the following year (1900), under the supervision of architect Carl Meyer.

The scheme comprised pumping stations, an administrative building and business facilities. In 1937, after the construction of a new pumping station, the former building ceased operating. Until 2000, it was partly used as a pressure filter station and storage hall before being left deserted.

Between 2002 and 2010, the facility have been restored using EU funds. Since 2010, the buildings host cultural events and happenings like concerts.

Since December 30, 2012, the complex has been hosting the Waterworks Museum, first of its kind in Poland. The Pumping Hall is one of the main attractions in Bydgoszcz environmental education. The second element is the Water Tower of Bydgoszcz, located in Szwederowo district.

== Architecture ==
The urban water supply station complex includes:

- a pumping station;
- a residential house;
- a collective well.

The architectural style is eclecticism. Buildings have brick façades, with varied plastered panels.

The most interesting architecture is displayed in the former pumping station with stained glass windows decorated using plant and animal motifs. Wood openwork carving decorations are present and placed in three triangular gables. The interior is adorned with coffered wooden ceiling, supported by a row of columns, extended by profile heads and stained with herons and swans motifs. The majority of the technical equipment has been disassembled for the purposes of an exhibition in 2002, leaving only a small crane made in Mannheim in 1933.

The well building is low elevated, crowned with an octagonal lantern and a spire.

In the vicinity is a one level administration building, with modest Neo-Gothic features, crowned with a circular tower in its north corner.

The building and its architectural environment has been put on the Pomeranian heritage list (Nr.601332-Reg.A/812/1-5) on 4 November 1992.

== Las Gdanski water intake ==
Original Water intake (Las Gdanski) was launched in 1900 to water the then 40 000 inhabitants of Bromberg. It remained the main city supply for drinking water until 1962, when a new one was built at Czyżkówko, pumping Brda water.

Until 1920, 34 wells have been drilled to draw Quaternary period stored water from the ground. The peak of water consumption has been 6000 m^{3} per day. In the 1930s, the intake field was expanded and in 1940, the pumping station included in 20 additional wells.

New wells were put into operation in 1966: they could reach Tertiary and Cretaceous periods levels (approx. 200 m deep). Lower Cretaceous aquifer has been exploited intensively since 1975.

Supply network has been modernized in the 1990s and in 2000–2009, within the responsibility of the Bydgoszcz Water Supply Development Program and Plumbing Services. Since 2008, 13 new wells draw water from Cretaceous level (down to 360 m deep) and 6 wells from Quaternary aquifers (down to 80 m deep). Actual production capacity is 1825 m^{3}/h with a water consumption at an average of 24000 m^{3}/day, which meets 50% of Bydgoszcz demand for drinking water. Water drawn from Cretaceous wells represents about 80% of the production.

At Las Gdanski water station, free public dredging points are available, one with treated water, the second with raw water pumped directly through a well chalk.

== Gallery ==
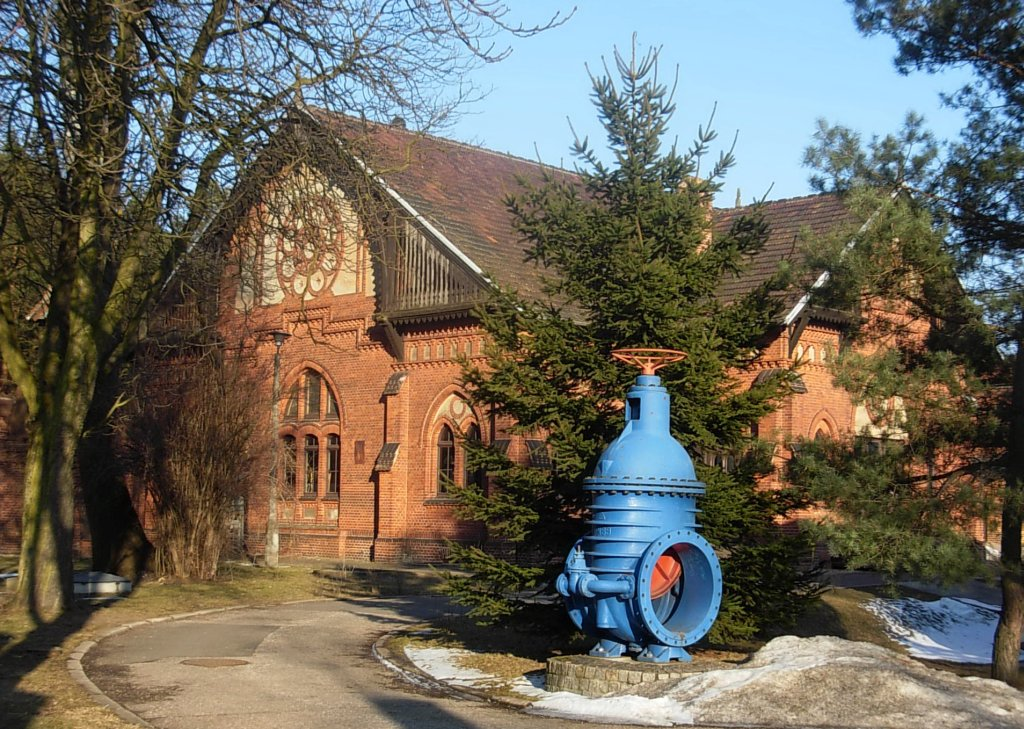
Pumping Station

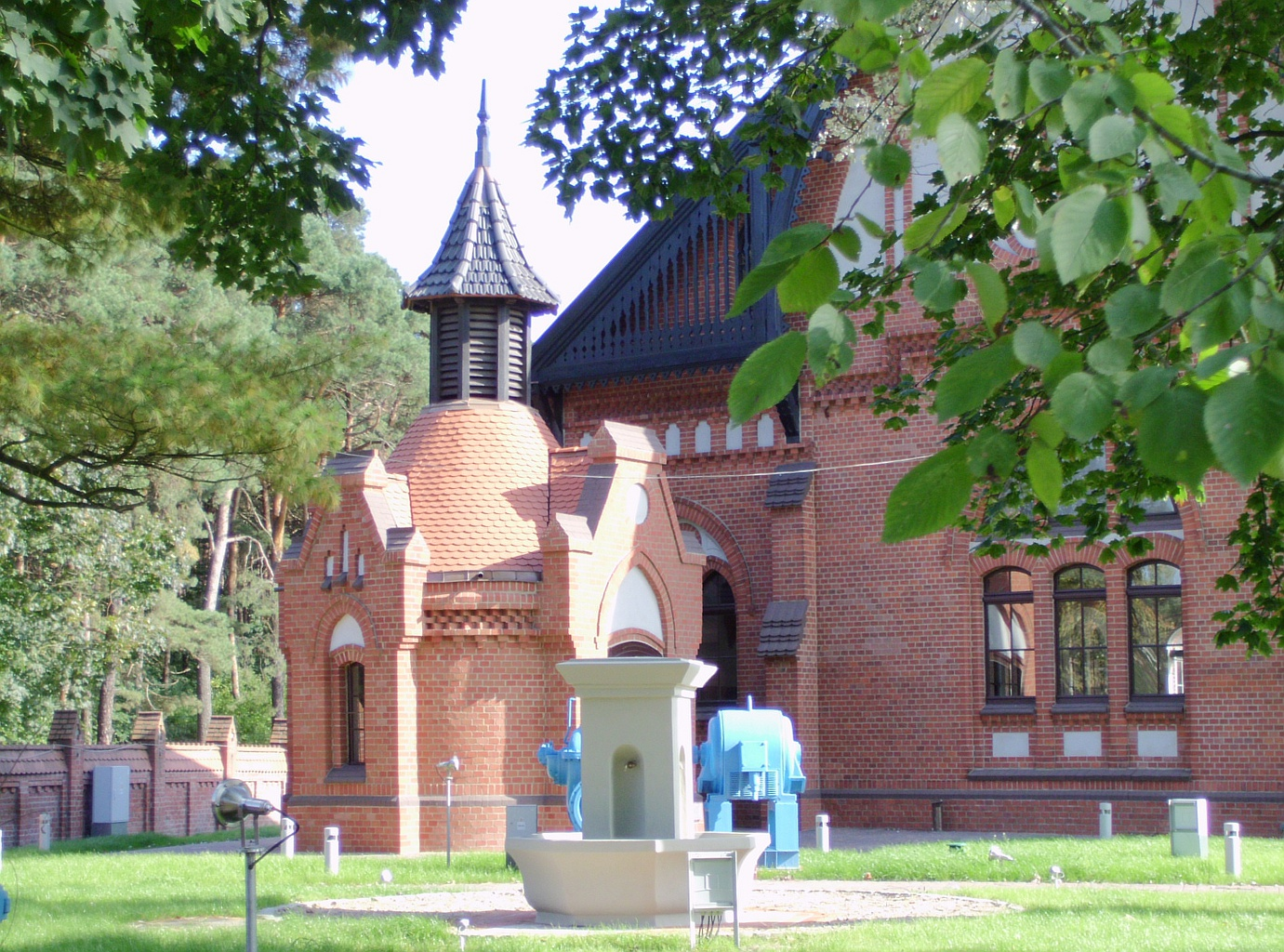
Pumping Station

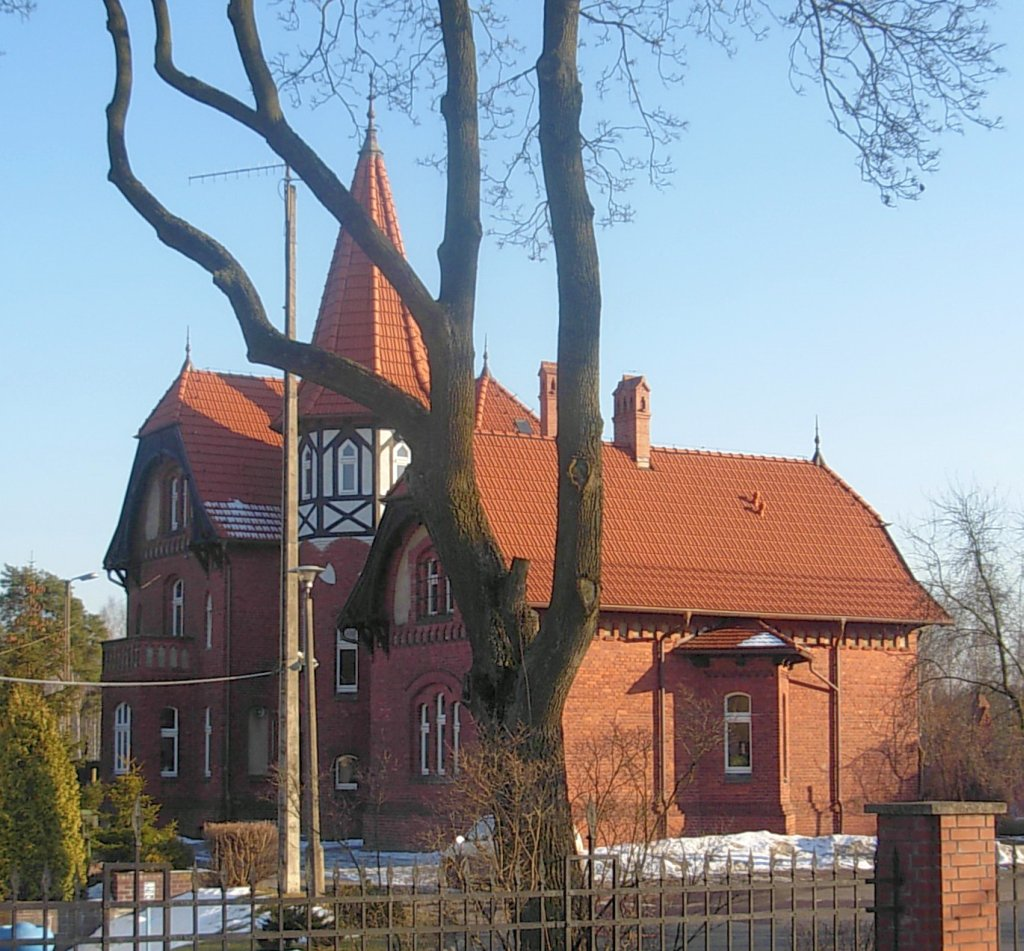
Administrative Building

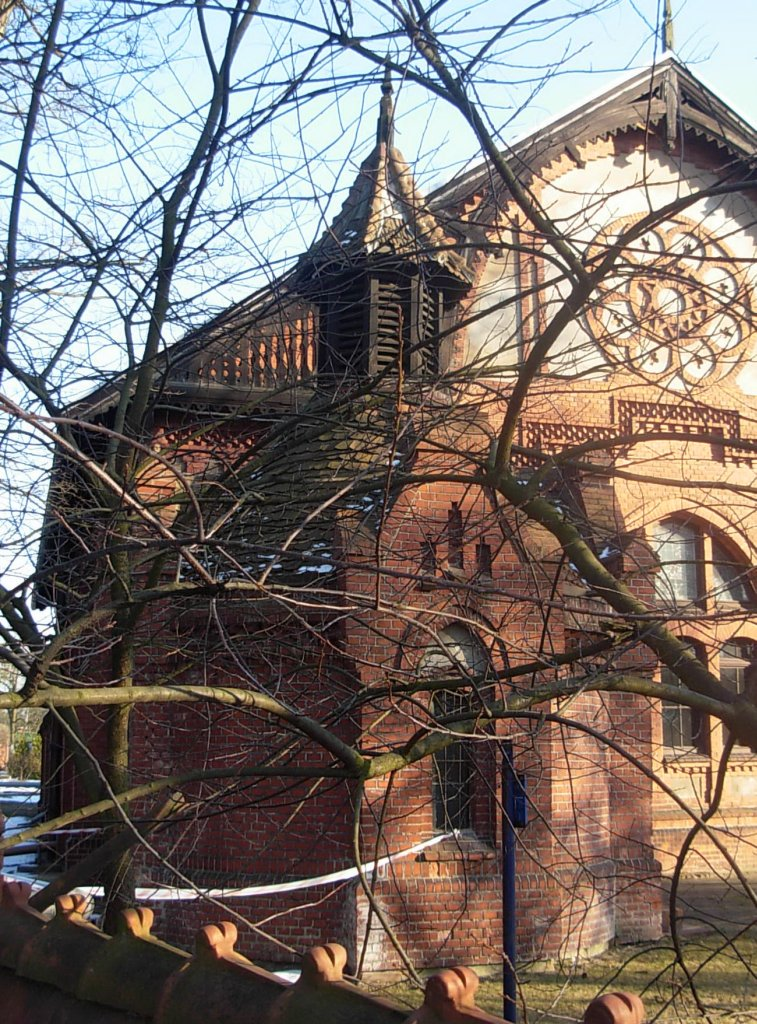
Collective well

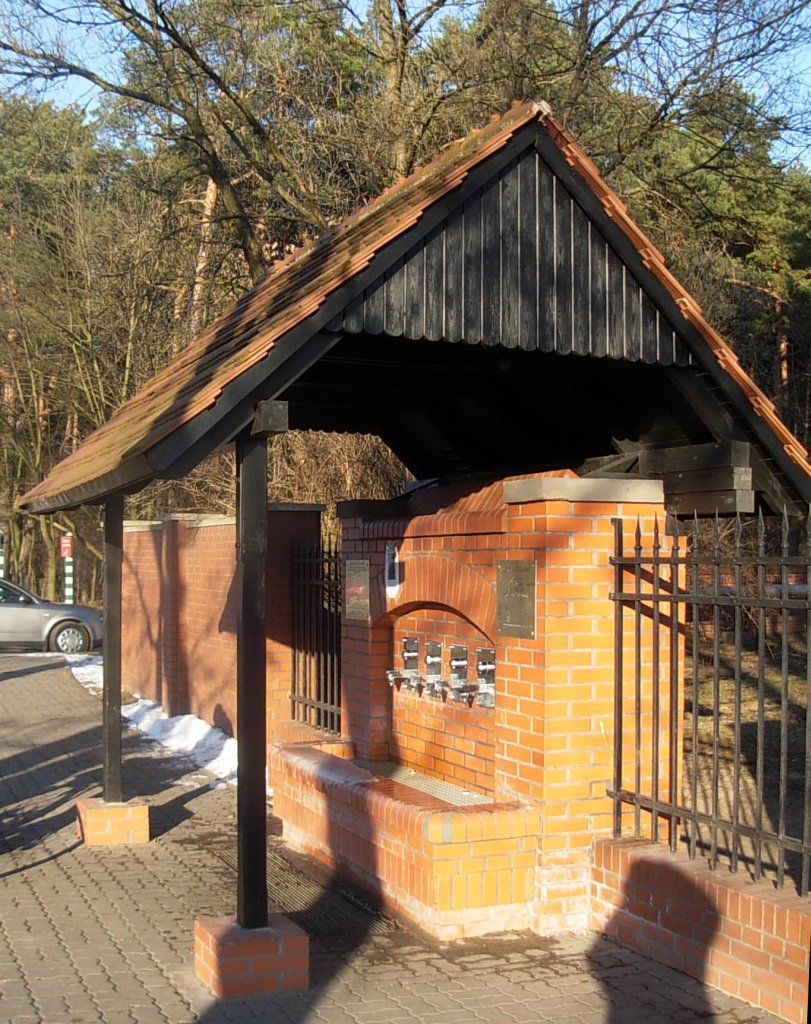
Public dredging points

== See also ==
- Bydgoszcz
- Gdańska Street, Bydgoszcz
- The old water tower of Bydgoszcz
- (in Polish) Waterworks Museum of Bydgoszcz
- (in Polish) Downtown district in Bydgoszcz

== Bibliography ==
- (in Polish) Bręczewska-Kulesza Daria, Derkowska-Kostkowska Bogna, Wysocka A. (2003). Ulica Gdańska. Przewodnik historyczny. Bydgoszcz: Wojewódzki Ośrodek Kultury w Bydgoszczy. ISBN 8386970103.
- (in Polish) Parucka, Krystyna (2008). Zabytki Bydgoszczy – minikatalog. Bydgoszcz: "Tifen" Krystyna Parucka. ISBN 9788392719106.
- (in Polish) Czajkowski, Edmund (1983). 460 lat bydgoskich wodociągów. Kalendarz Bydgoski. Bydgoszcz: Towarzystwo Miłosnikow Miasta Bydgoszczy. pp. 149–156.
