= Gdańsk Street 95, Bydgoszcz =

Tenement at 95 Gdanska street
- Polish: Kamienica Gdańska 95 w Bydgoszczy
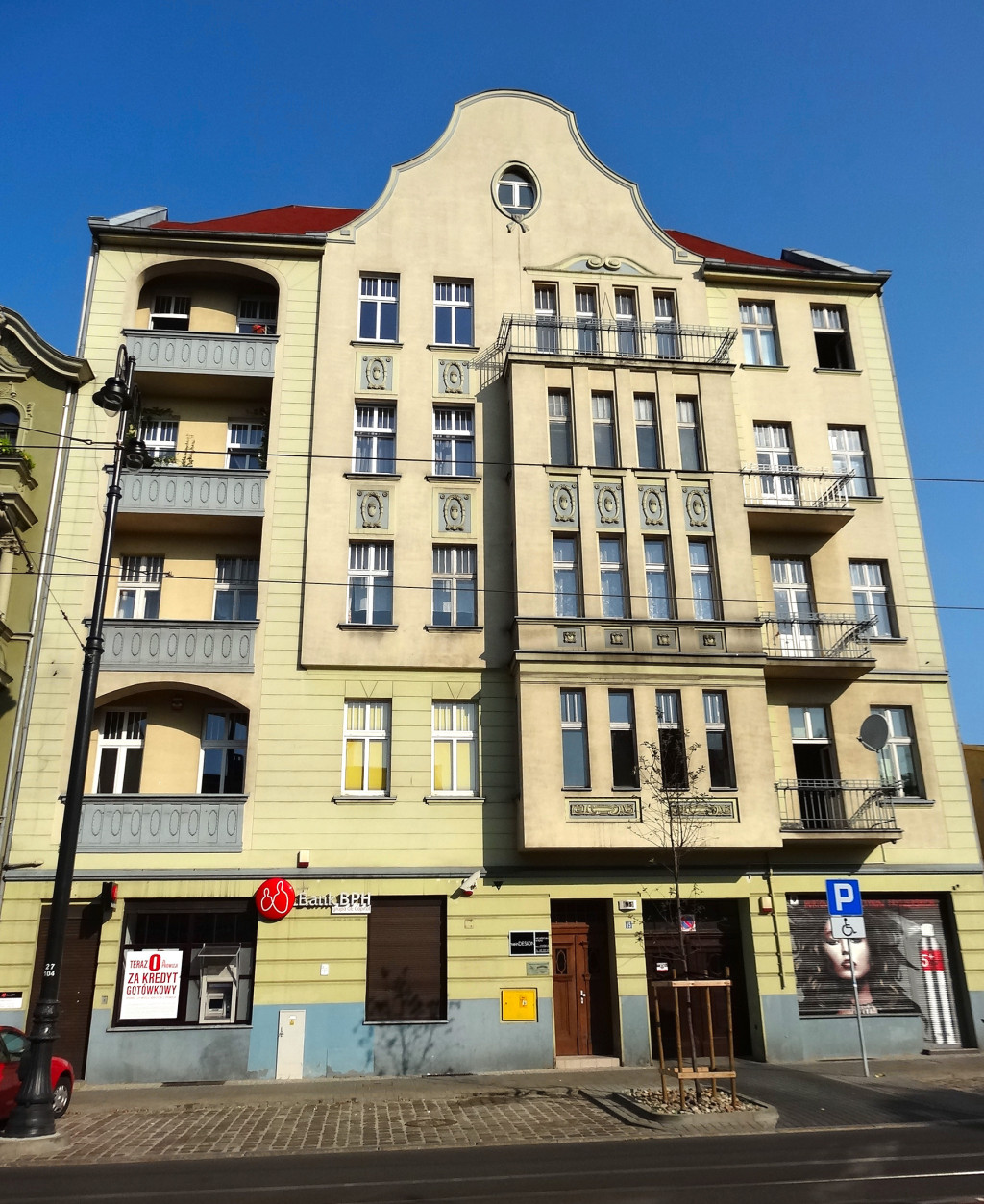
- Tenement from Gdańska Street

General information
- Type: Tenement
- Architectural style: Modern architecture
- Location: 95 Gdańska Street, Bydgoszcz, Poland
- Coordinates: 53°7′59″N 18°0′37″E
- Groundbreaking: 1912
- Completed: 1913

Technical details
- Floor count: 5

Design and construction
- Architect(s): Paul Sellner

The tenement at 95 Gdańska street is a historical habitation building located in Gdańska Street, in Bydgoszcz, Poland.

== Location ==
The building stands on the western side of Gdańska Street, between Chocimska street and Świętojańska street.

It stands close to remarkable tenements in the same street:

- Paul Storz Tenement at 81;
- Villa Carl Grosse at 84;
- Tenement at 86 Gdańska street;
- Villa Hugo Hecht at 88/90;
- Tenement at 91 Gdańska street;
- Hugo Hecht tenement at 92/94;
- Carl Bradtke Tenement at 93.

== History ==
The house was built in 1912-1913, on a design by Bydgoszcz's architect Paul Sellner. At the time, the address was 54 Danzigerstrasse, Bromberg.

In 1914, Robert Schulz set up a restaurant on the ground floor that operated until 1920.

== Architecture ==
Tenement presents an early modernist style.

The three-storey avant-corps are decorated with laurel wreaths and stylized vases and flowers low-reliefs. A dissymetry is created by balconies on the right side and logias on the opposite side. Inside, the building has got a preserved elevator with a wrought metal door.

Paul Sellner, the architect, has been a student of architect Karl Bergner. In 1904, he opened his own architectural study office in Bromberg, where he stayed at least until 1922. In Bydgoszcz Paul Sellner designed also another habitation house at 2 Świętojańska Street, (intersection with Gdańska Street) in 1911-1912.

== Gallery ==
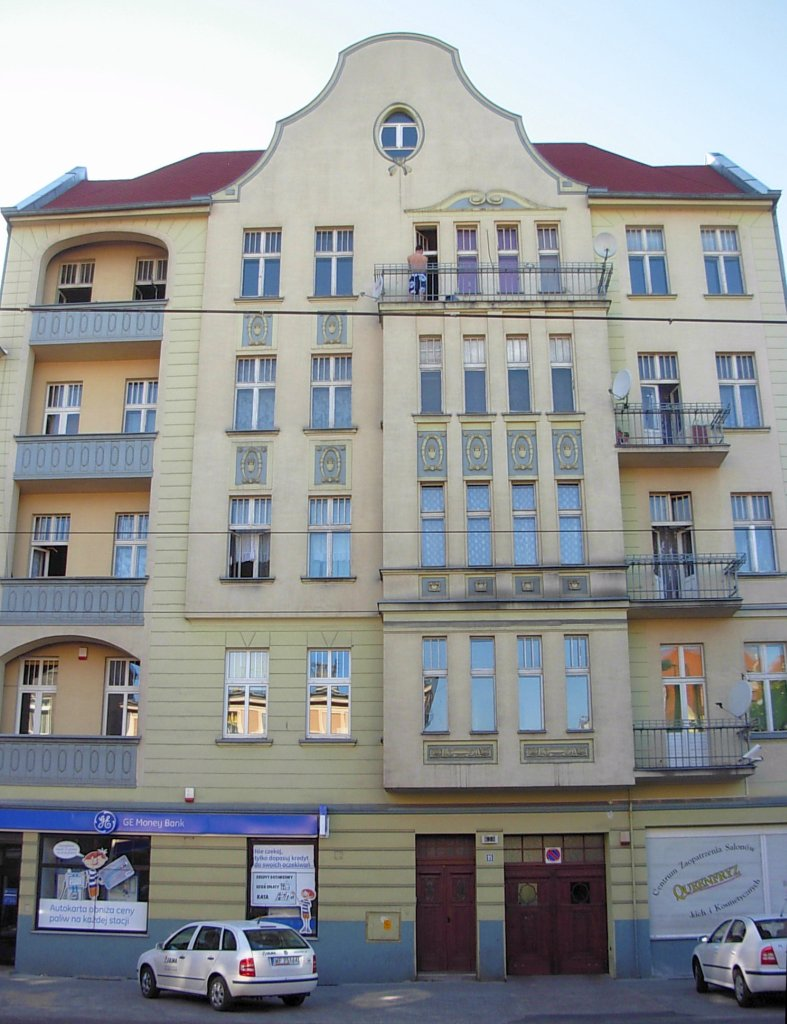
Frontage on Gdańska street

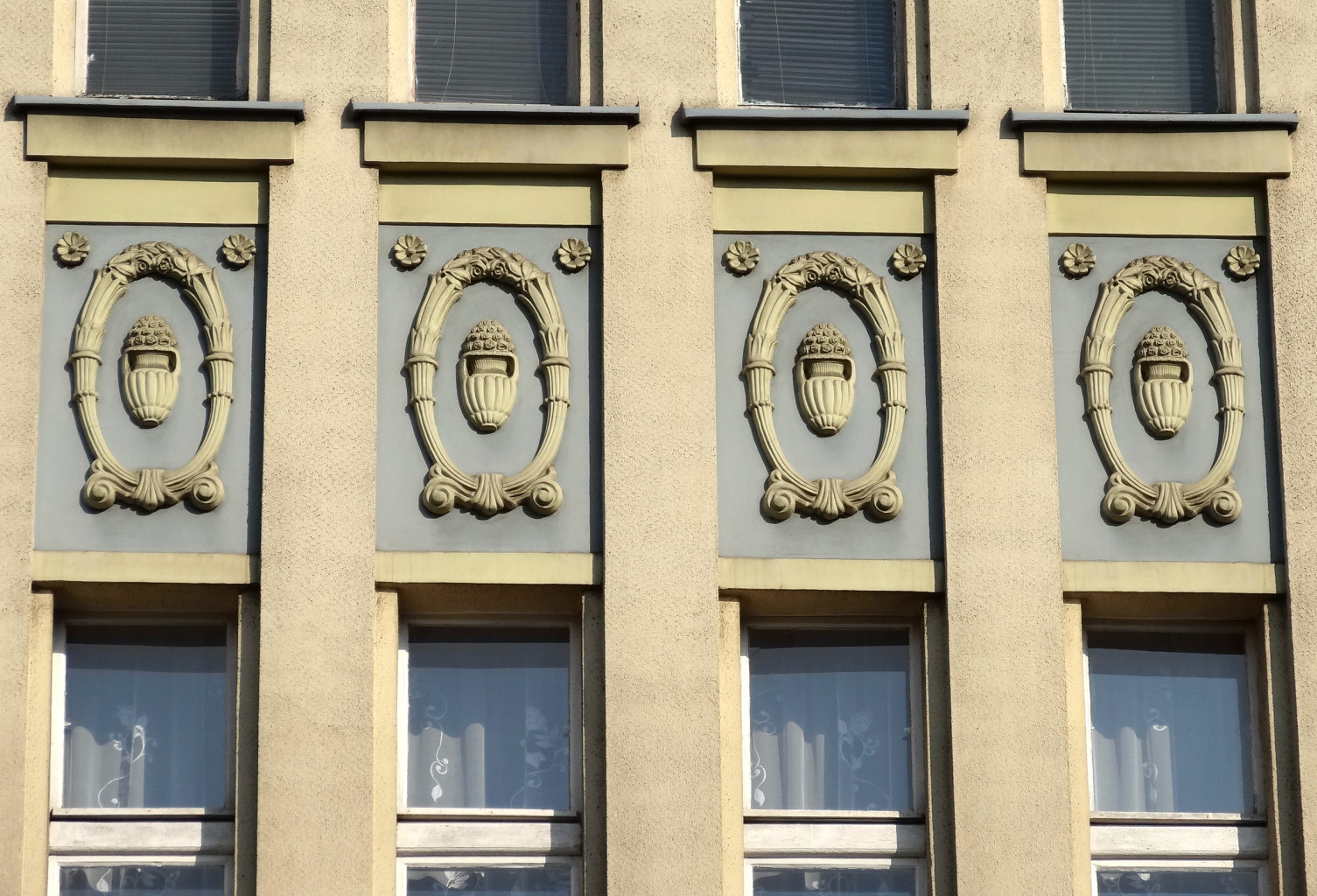
Reliefs details

== See also ==
- Bydgoszcz
- Gdanska Street in Bydgoszcz
- Bydgoszcz Architects (1850-1970s)
- (in Polish) Downtown district in Bydgoszcz

== Bibliography ==
- Bręczewska-Kulesza Daria, Derkowska-Kostkowska Bogna, Wysocka A. (2003). Ulica Gdańska. Przewodnik historyczny (in Polish). Bydgoszcz: Wojewódzki Ośrodek Kultury w Bydgoszczy. ISBN 8386970103.
