= Otto Riedl Tenement =

- Polish: Kamienica Otto Riedla w Bydgoszczy
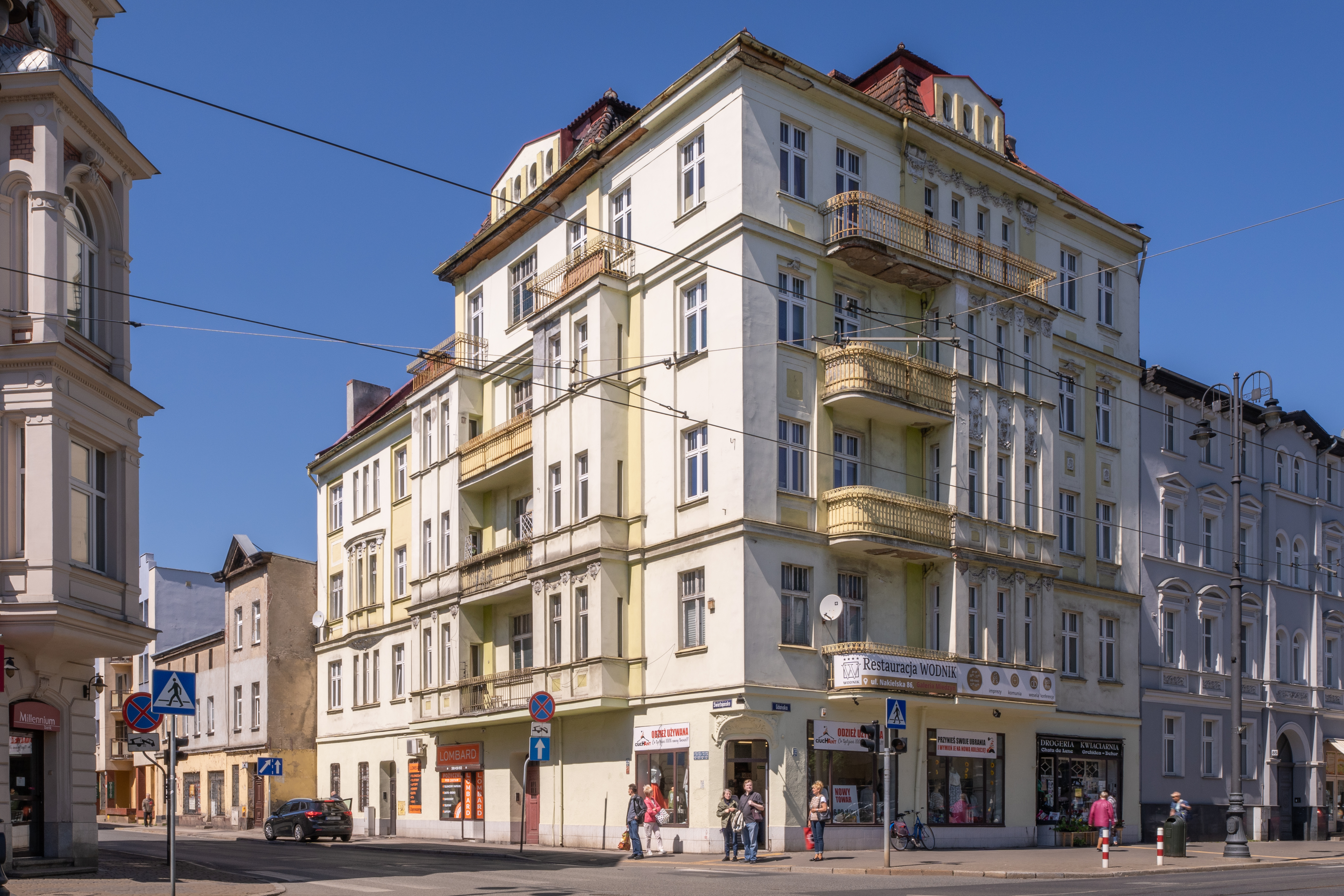
- Tenement from Gdanska Street

General information
- Type: Tenement
- Architectural style: Modern architecture
- Location: 2 Świętojańska Street, at the intersection with Gdańska Street, Bydgoszcz, Poland
- Coordinates: 53°7′56″N 18°0′34″E
- Groundbreaking: 1911
- Completed: 1912
- Client: Otto Riedl

Technical details
- Floor count: 5

Design and construction
- Architect(s): Paul Sellner

Otto Riedl Tenement is a habitation building located at 2 Świętojańska Street, in Bydgoszcz, Poland.

== Location ==
The building stands on the western side of Gdańska street at the intersection with Świętojańska Street. It stands close to remarkable tenements in the same street:

- Tenement at 71 Gdanska street;
- Tenement at 75 Gdanska street;
- Ernst Bartsch tenement at 79;
- Paul Storz Tenement at 81;
- Rudolf Kern Tenement.

== History ==
The house was built in 1911–1912 for the baker (German: bäckermeister) Otto Riedel, according to a design by the architect Paul Sellner.

Paul Sellner has been a student of the architect Karl Bergner. In 1904, he opened his own architectural study office in Bromberg, where he stayed at least until 1922. In Bydgoszcz Paul Sellner also designed, the building at Gdanska Street 95 in 1912–1913.

Otto Riedel moved to Świętojańska Street 2, then 48 Danzigerstrasse, in 1891 to establish his bakery. He had the house rebuilt in 1911–1912 and kept his business running in the new building.

The edifice also housed a hardware store, German: Engelhardt Droguen since 1915. Otto Riedel lived there until at least 1933. There is still today a hardware store ("Drogeria Aster") at this address.

Vincent Bigoński established here his bakery in 1924. After his death, his son and now his grand-niece have been running the shop at Gdańska Street till 2020.

== Architecture ==
The house reflects the architectural characteristic of years 1900–1910, as far as early Modern architecture is concerned.

The building block is massive, in that way it balances the symmetry with the opposite building.

Both facades have a modest decoration but it is underlined by various components (pilasters, balconies).

== Gallery ==
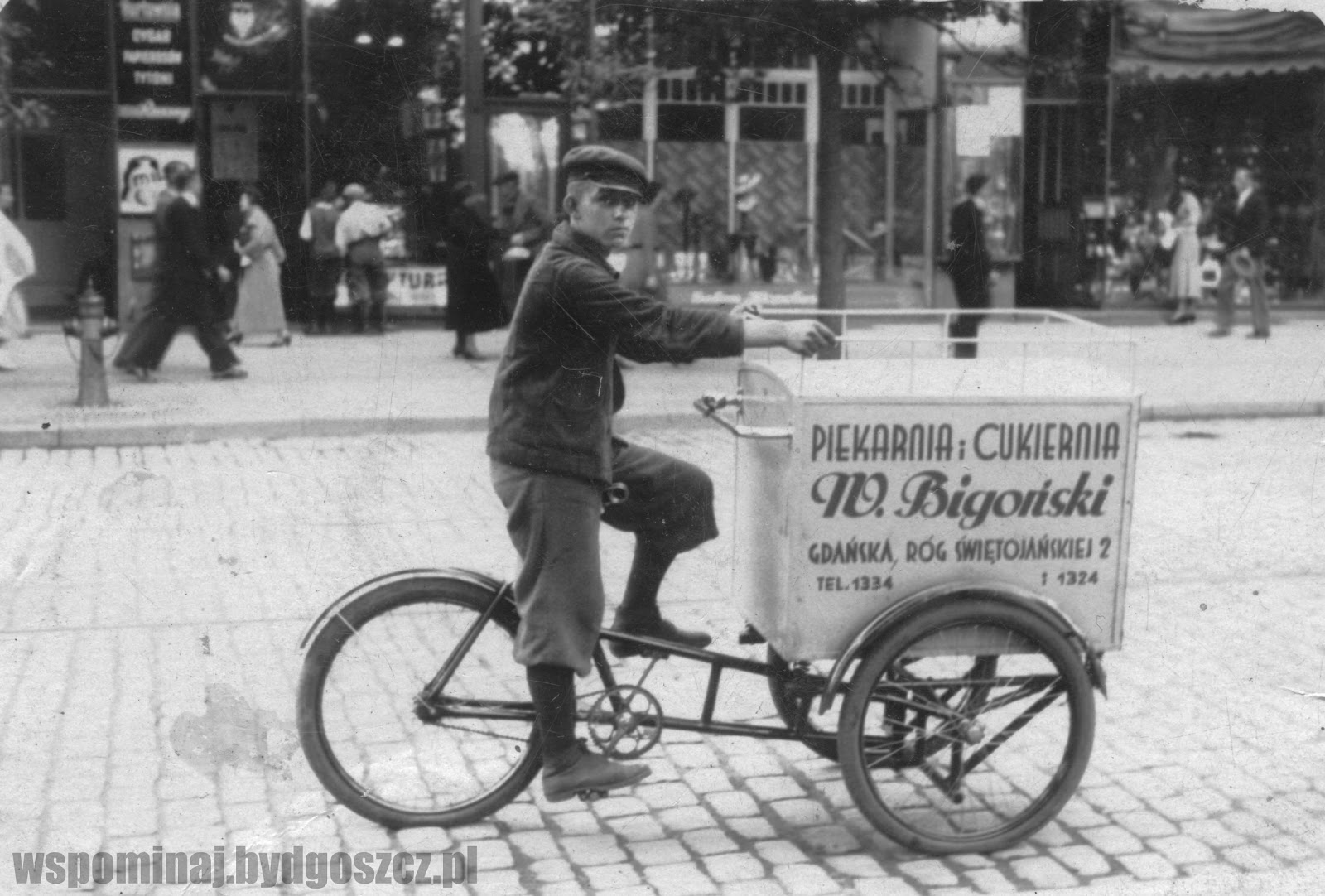
Advertising for Bigoński bakery in the 1930s

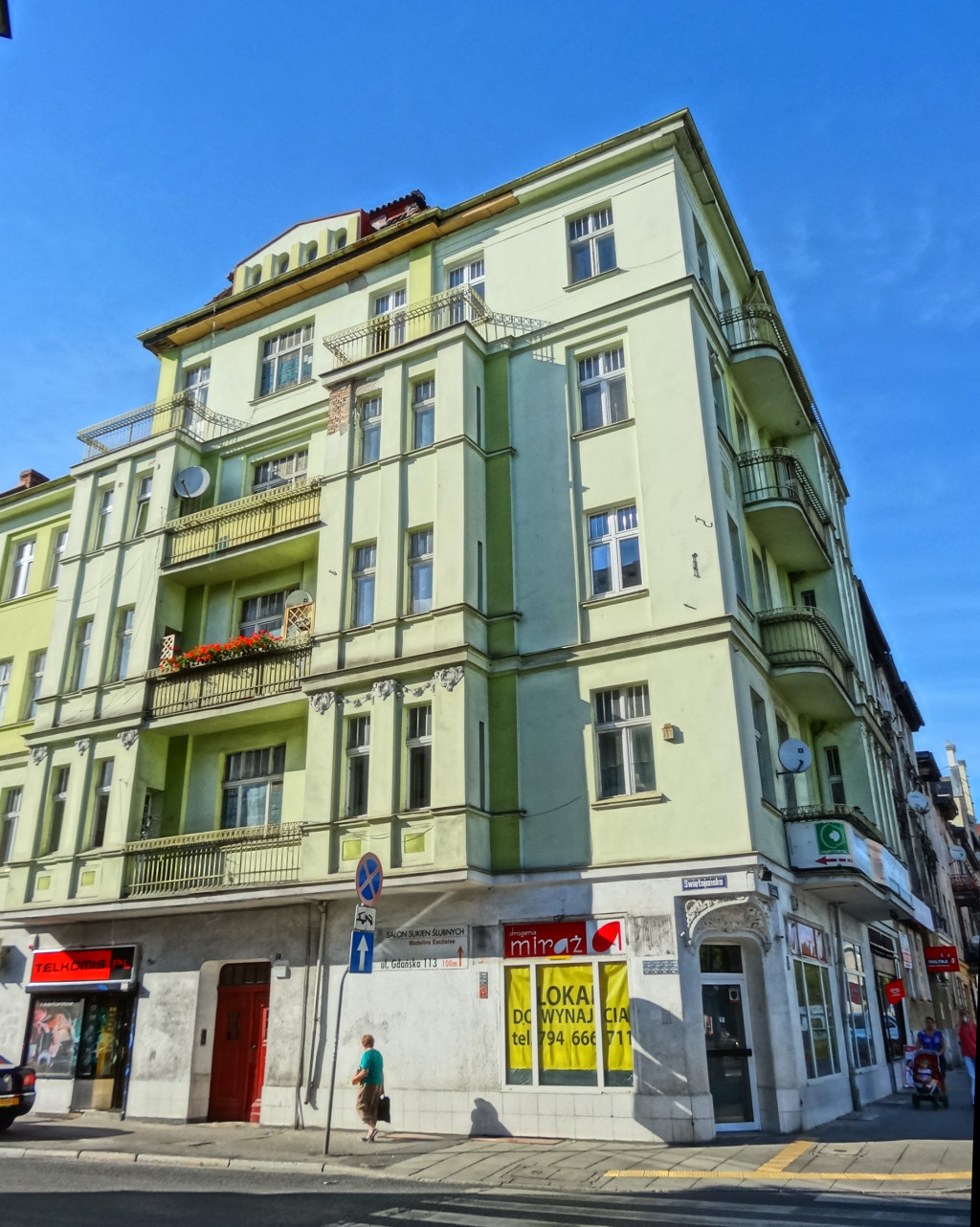
View from Swietojanska street

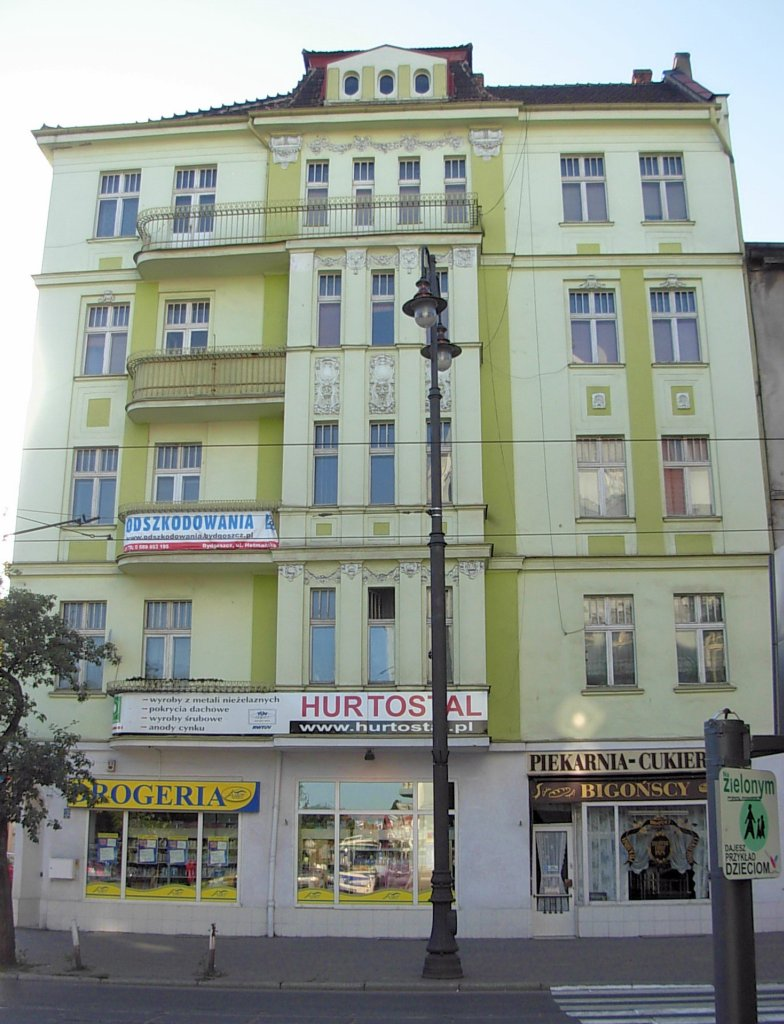
Facade onto Gdańska street

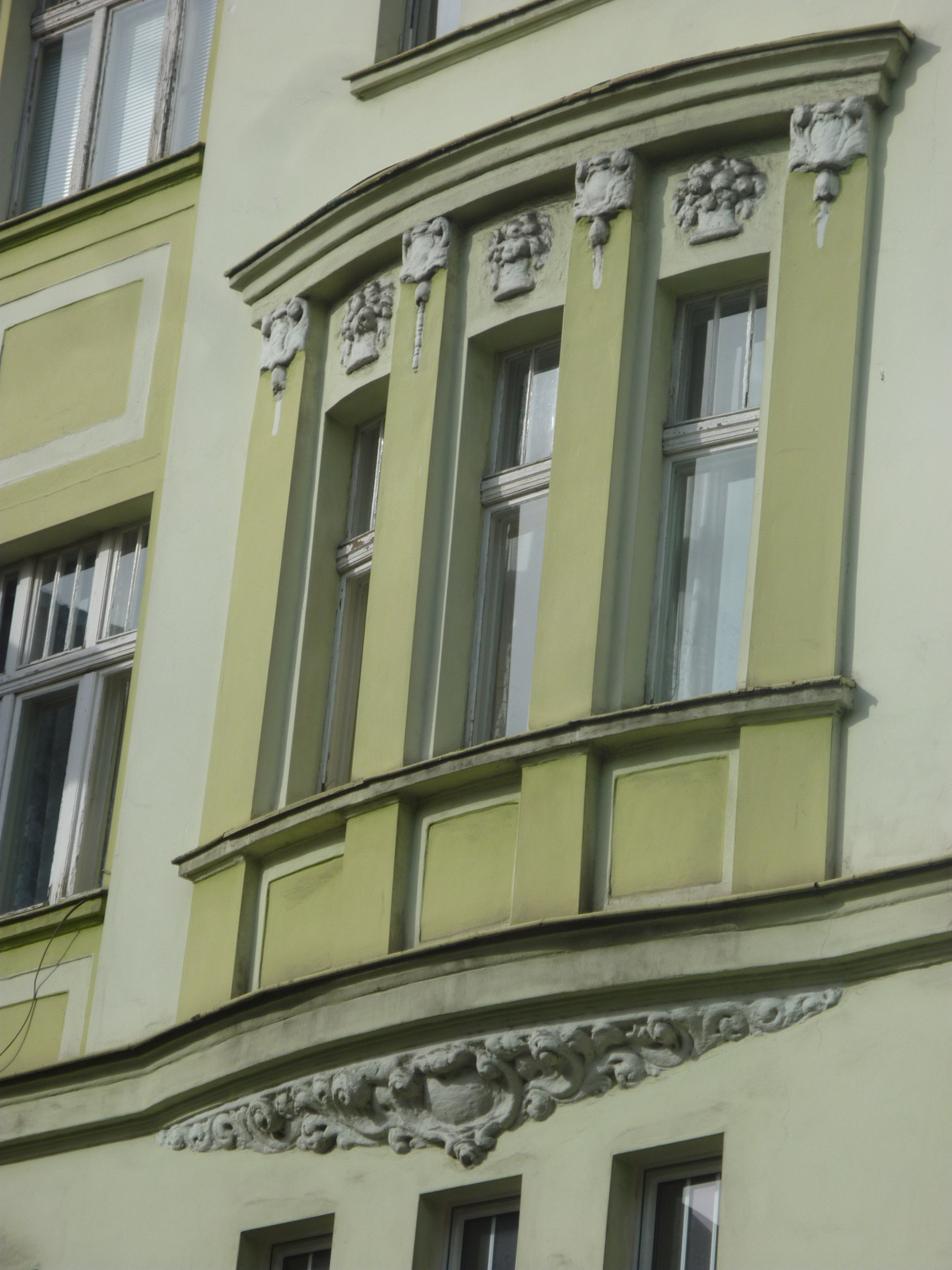
Facade detail

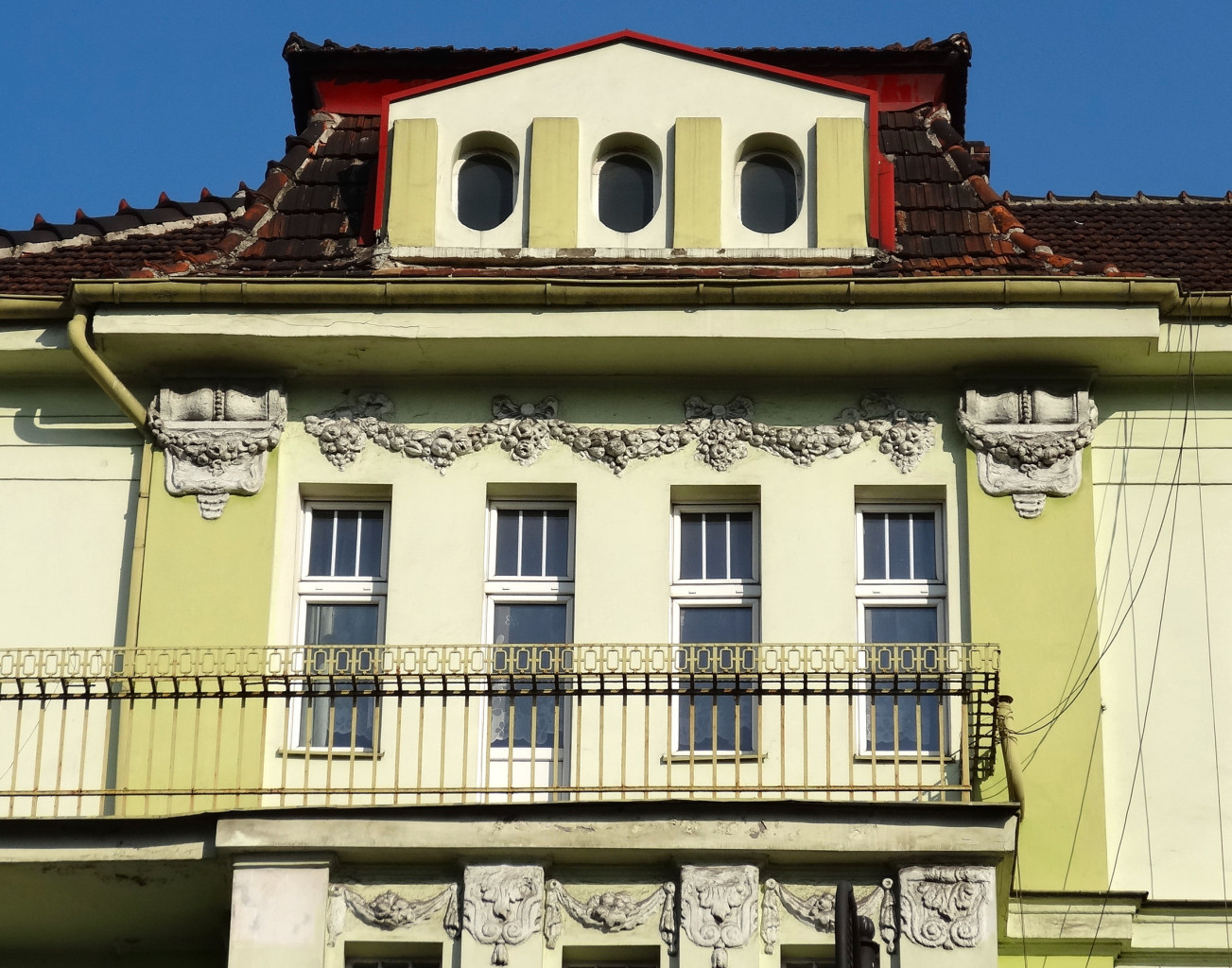
Detail of the roof

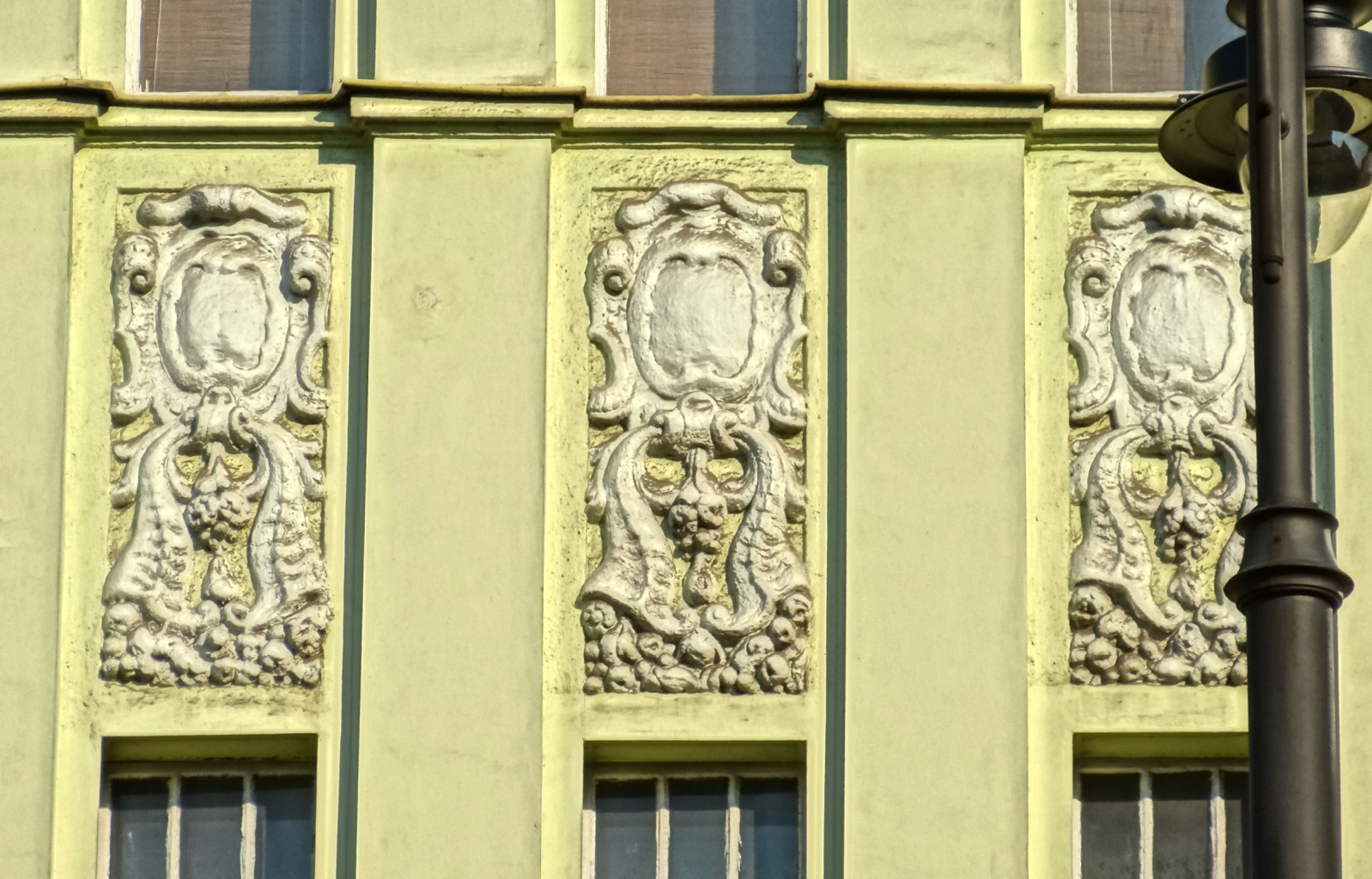
Relief detail

== See also ==
- Bydgoszcz
- Gdanska Street in Bydgoszcz
- Paul Sellner
- (in Polish) Downtown district in Bydgoszcz

== Bibliography ==
- (in Polish) Bręczewska-Kulesza Daria, Derkowska-Kostkowska Bogna, Wysocka A. (2003). Ulica Gdańska. Przewodnik historyczny. Bydgoszcz: Wojewódzki Ośrodek Kultury w Bydgoszczy. ISBN 9788386970100.
