= Villa Carl Grosse =

Villa Carl Grosse in Bydgoszcz
- Polish: Willa Carla Grosse w Bydgoszczy
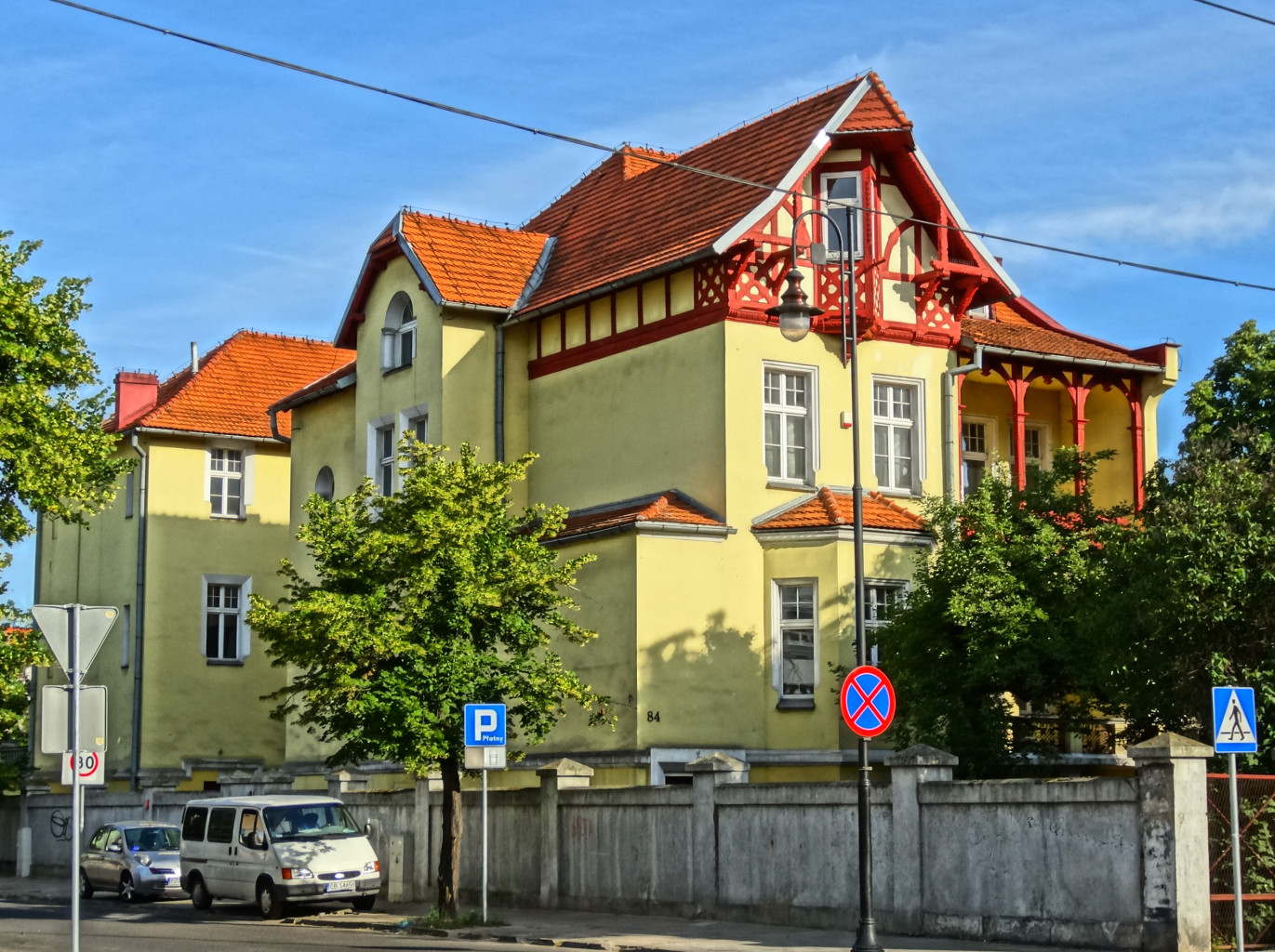
- View from Gdanska street
- Interactive map of the Villa Carl Grosse in Bydgoszcz area

General information
- Type: Villa
- Architectural style: German Historicism
- Classification: Nr.601312-Reg.A/1079/1-2, 13 December 1994
- Location: 84 Gdanska street, Bydgoszcz, Poland, Poland
- Coordinates: 53°7′59″N 18°0′40″E
- Construction started: 1898
- Completed: 1899
- Client: Carl Grosse

Technical details
- Floor count: 4

Design and construction
- Architect: Karl Bergner

The Villa Carl Grosse is a historical house in downtown Bydgoszcz, Poland. It is registered on the Kuyavian-Pomeranian Voivodeship Heritage List.

== Location ==
The building is somehow setback on the eastern side of Gdanska Street (Nr.84), at the intersection with Zamoyskiego street.

== History ==
The villa was built in 1898-1899 by architect Karl Bergner, following an order from Carl Grosse.

Mr Grosse ran in Bydgoszcz a cork factory (German: Ostdeutsche Kork-Fabrik), with the company seat here (Danzigerstrasse 127).

A subsequent owner - wood wholesaler Otto Schmidt - in the years 1918-1920 enriched the villa: he had built the decor that is still preserved today.

The building has undergone many renovations with succeeding owners and users. For many years in the 1920s, rumor went that the villa belonged to actress Apolonia Chalupiec, aka Pola Negri, from which it had been purchased by industrialist Jan Kłossowski, called "cardboard king", who lived there with his family in the 1930s. In reality, Jan Kłossowski bought the villa from the Bank Ludowy (German: Volksbank) in Bydgoszcz and Pola Negri's house was located at Zamoyskiego street 8.

Between 1962 and 1992, the building was the headquarters of the Civic Militia (MO), with a factory shop and a cafeteria.

== Architecture ==
The tenement is decorated in a style referring to German Historicism. The villa is separated from the street by a garden. Its facade has an asymmetric block, adorned with decorative bays, avant-corps, loggias and post-and-plank structures.

The interior is designed in art deco style, by Johanna H. Fricke. In addition to the stuccoes, worth noticing are stained glass, wooden reliefs (animal and plant motifs) and handrail stairwell. In the ballroom overlooking the garden is placed a fountain decorated with a sculpture of a woman washing her hair.

The building has been put on the Kuyavian-Pomeranian Voivodeship Heritage List Nr.601312 Reg.A/1079/1-2, on 13 December 1994.

== Gallery ==
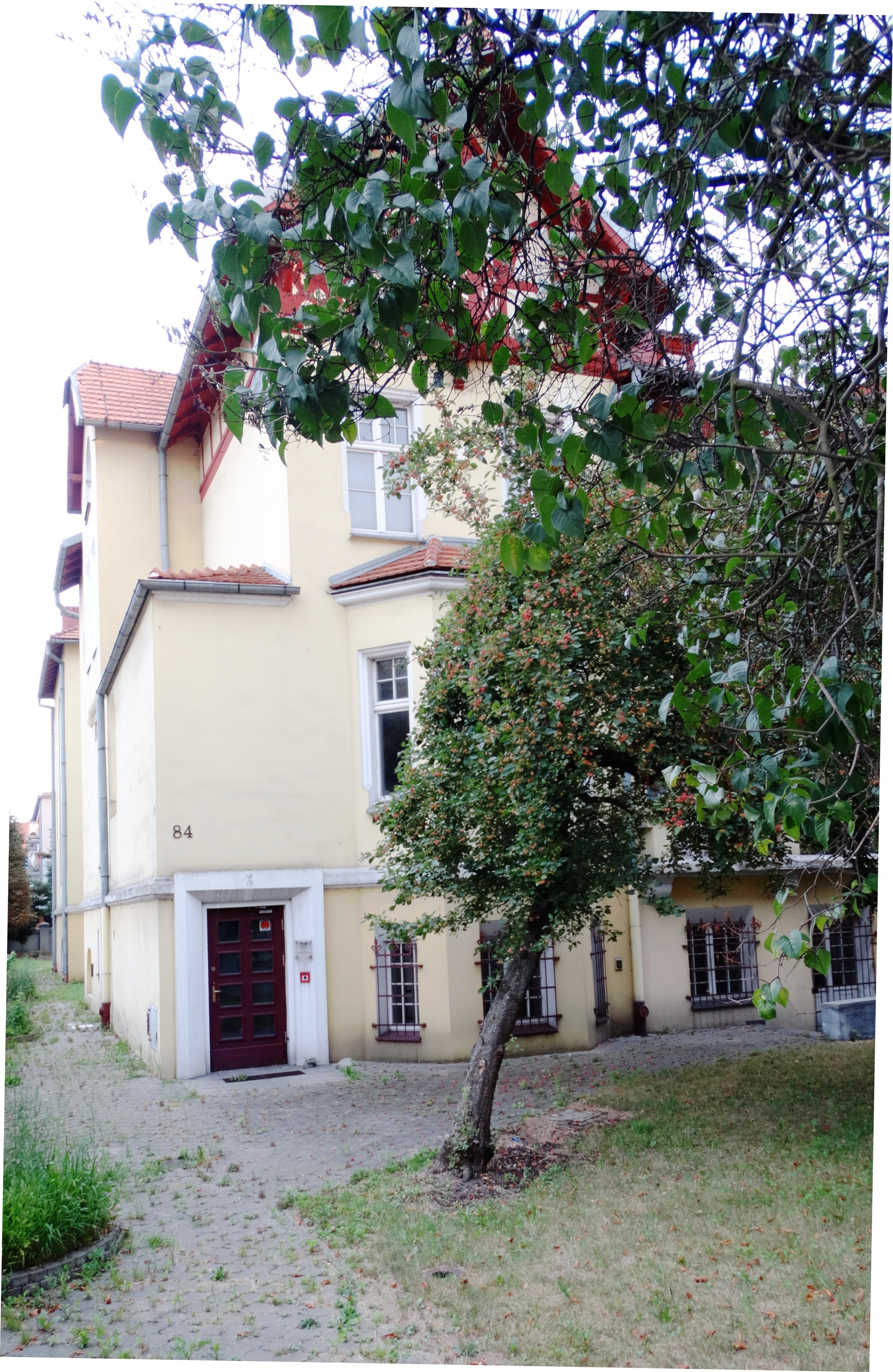
View from the garden

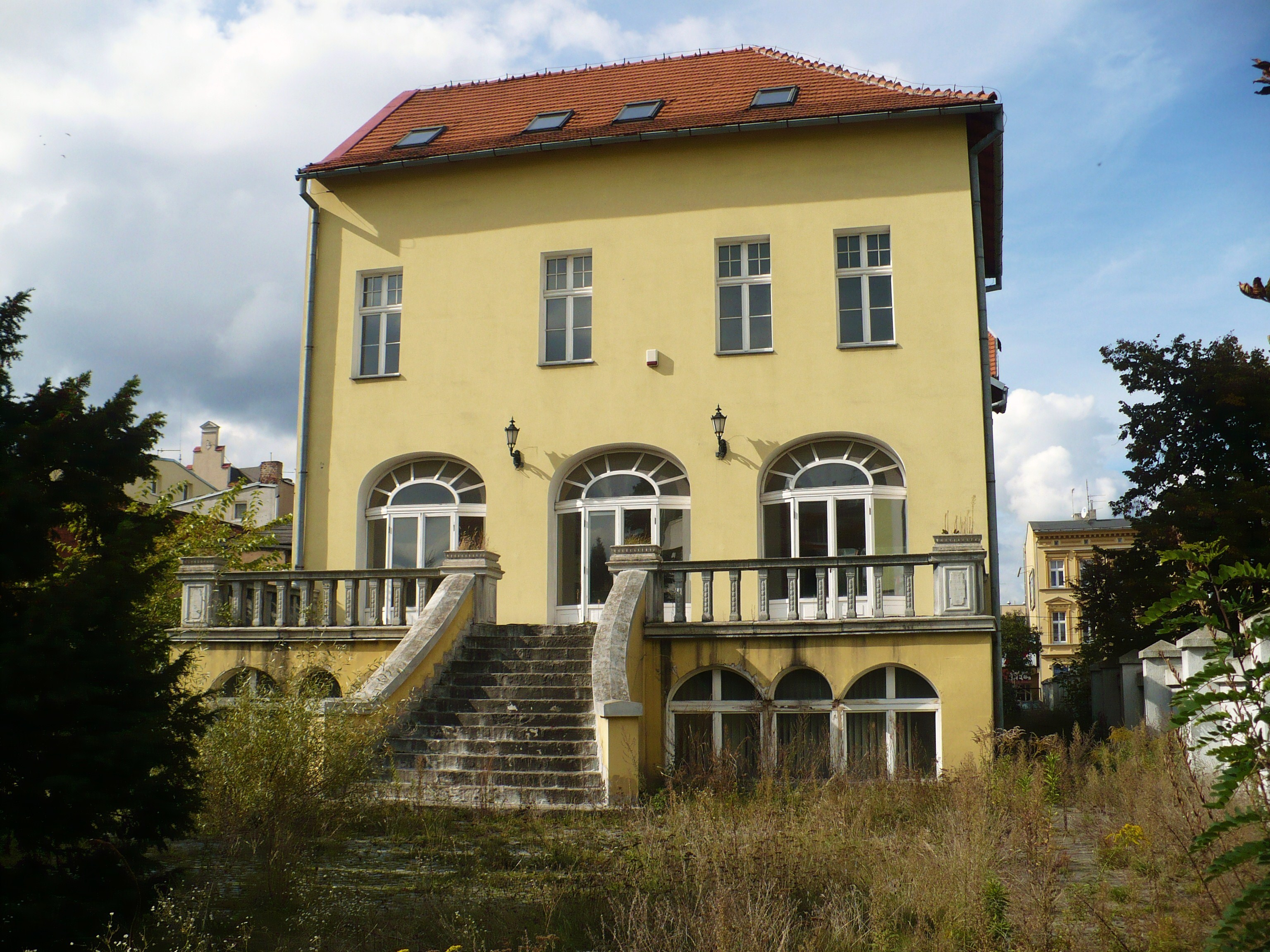
View from the garden

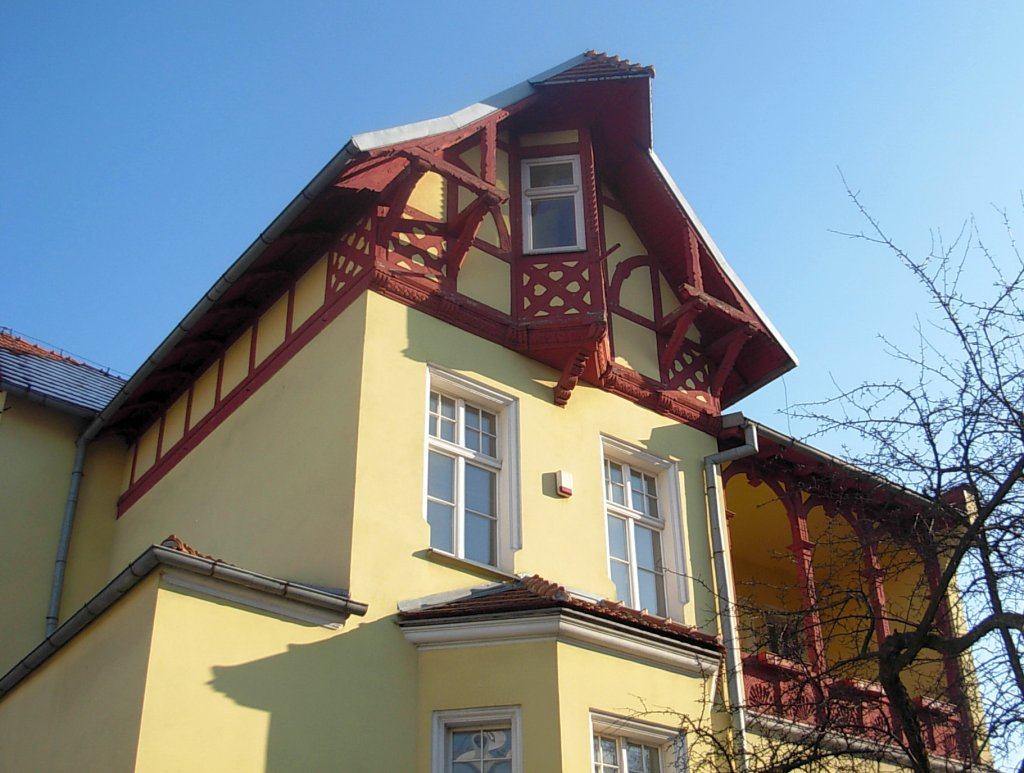
Zoom on the facade

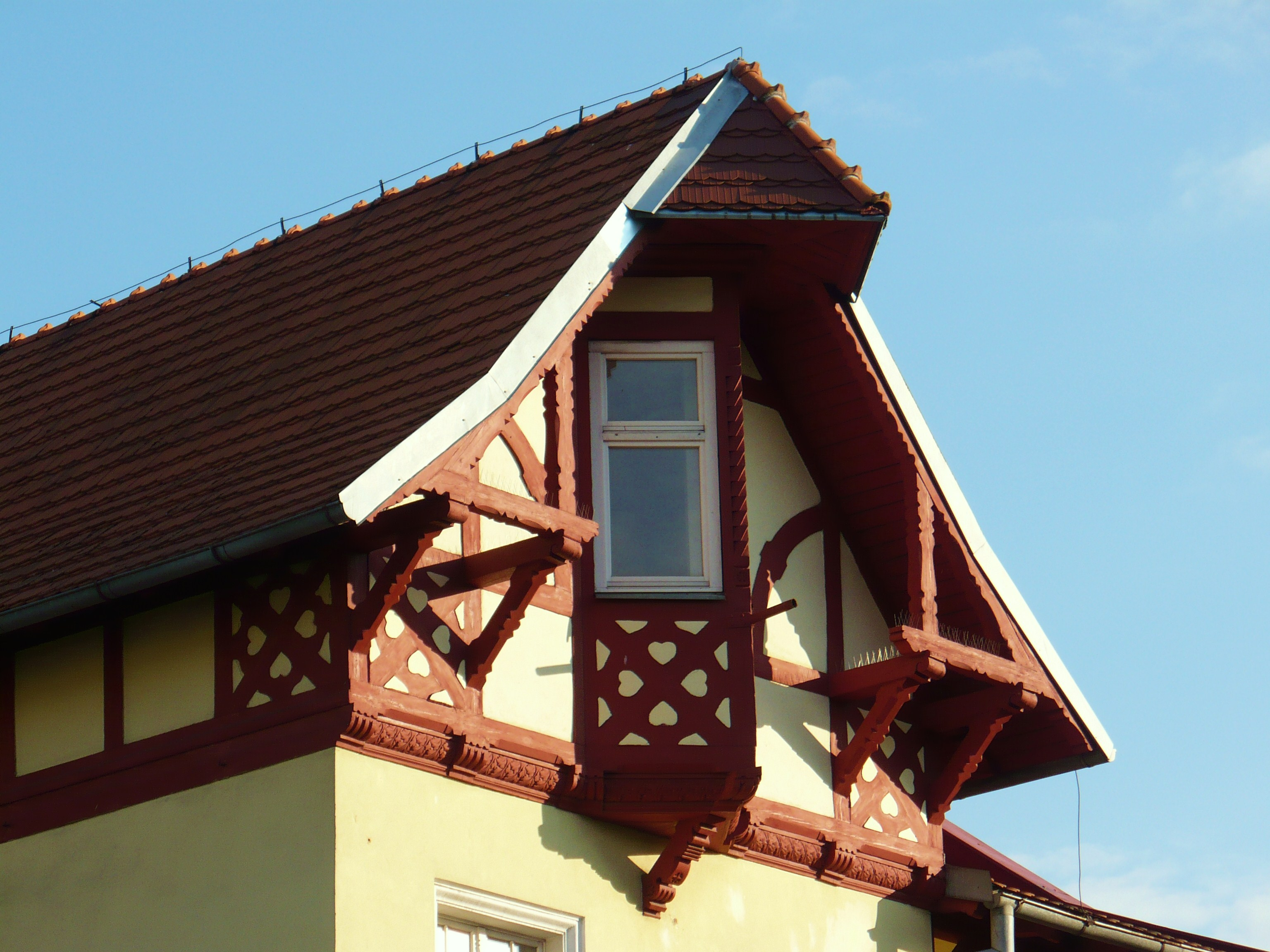
Detail of a gable

== See also ==
- Bydgoszcz
- Gdanska Street in Bydgoszcz
- (in Polish) Karl Bergner
- (in Polish) Downtown district in Bydgoszcz

== Bibliography ==
- (in Polish) Bręczewska-Kulesza Daria, Derkowska-Kostkowska Bogna, Wysocka A (2003). Ulica Gdańska. Przewodnik historyczny. Bydgoszcz: Wojewódzki Ośrodek Kultury w Bydgoszczy. ISBN 8386970103.
- (in Polish) Czajkowski, Edmund (1987). Na marginesie pewnej informacji. Kalendarz Bydgoski. Bydgoszcz: Towarzystwo Miłośników Miasta Bydgoszczy. pp. 39–41.
