= Nakielska Street, Bydgoszcz =

Street in Bydgoszcz, Poland

Nakielska Street in Bydgoszcz
Bydgoszcz
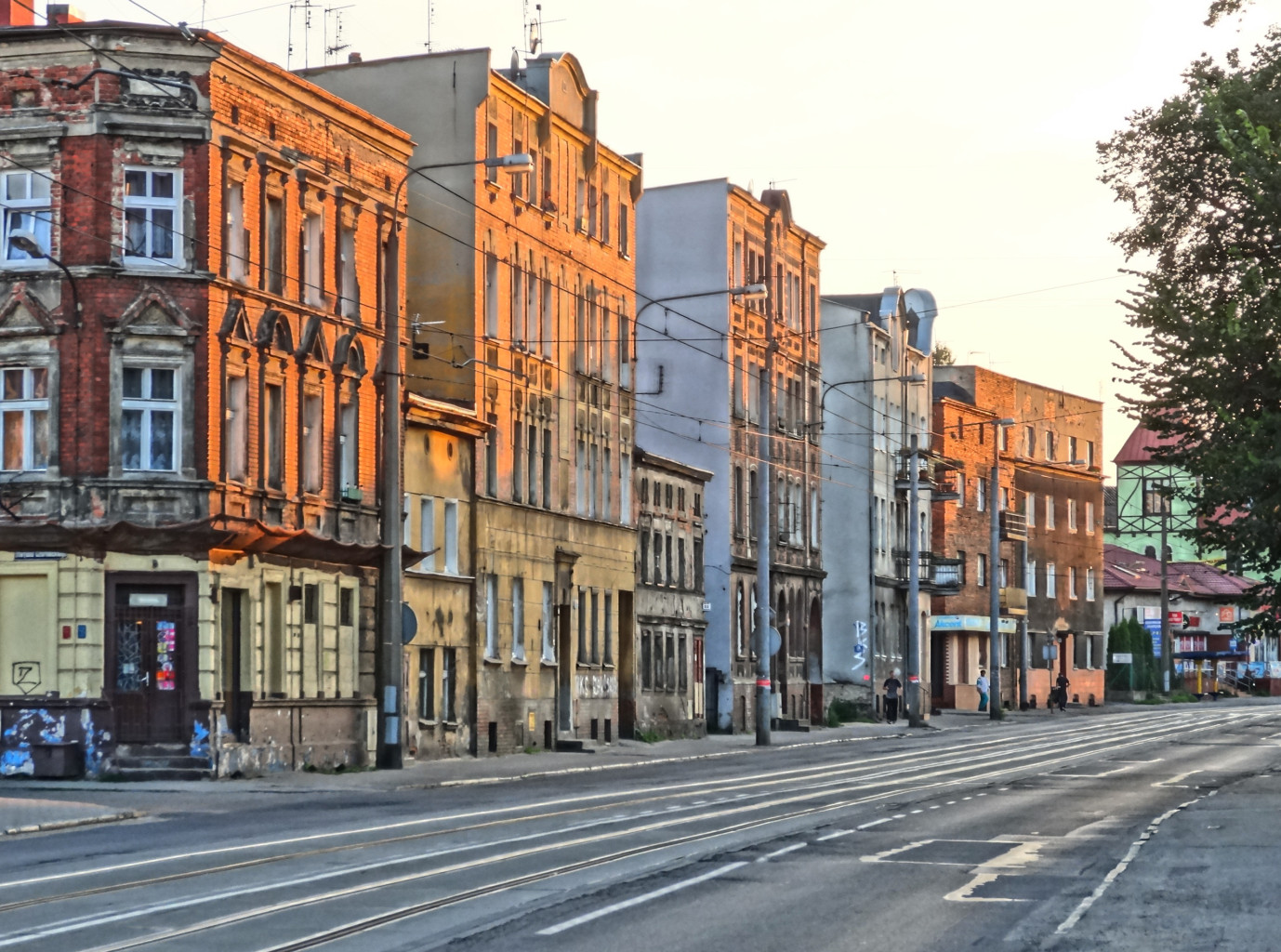
- View to the west

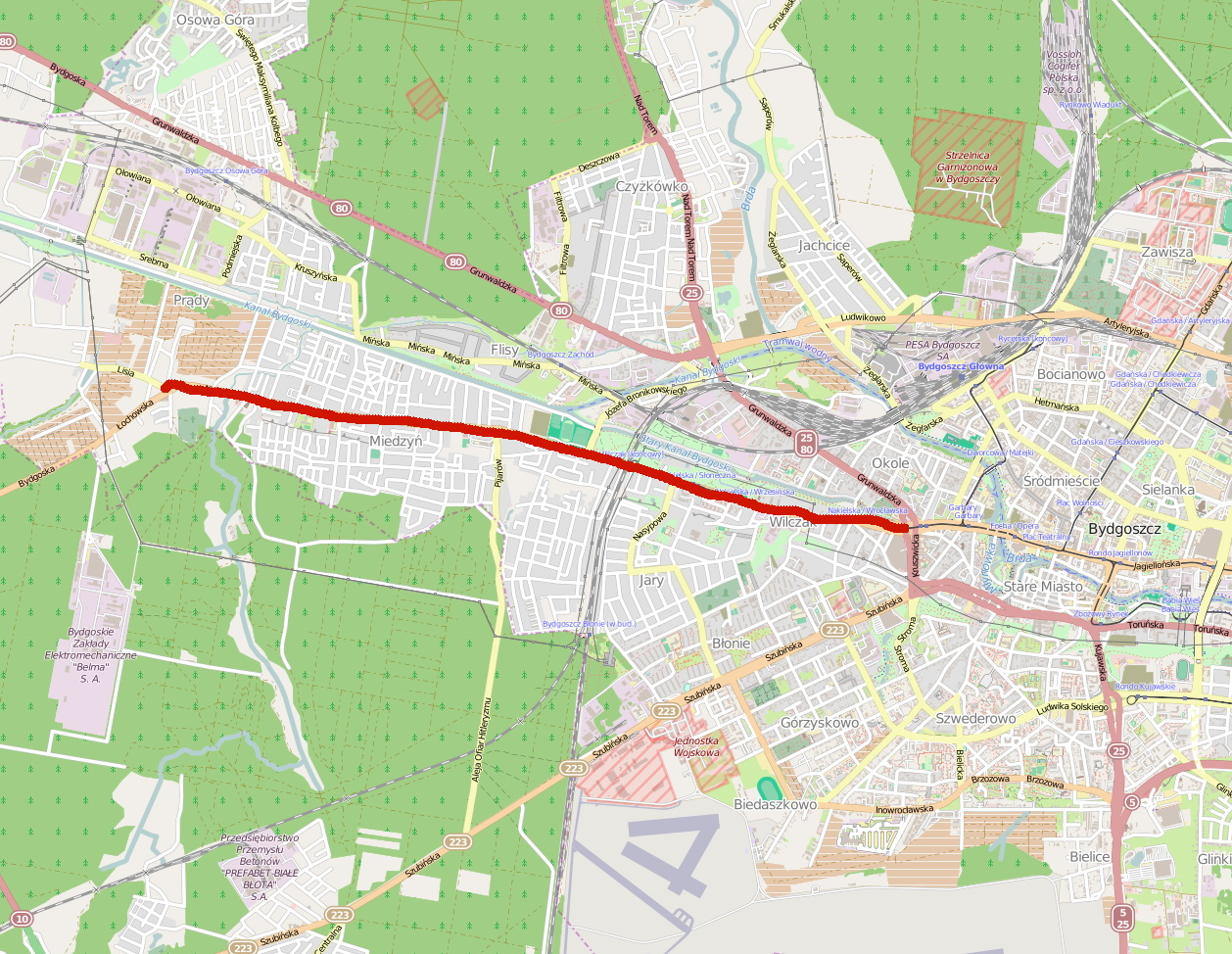
- Nakielska St. highlighted in red
- Native name: Ulica Nakielska w Bydgoszczy (Polish)
- Former name: Nakelerstraße - Ludendorffstraße
- Namesake: Nakło nad Notecią
- Owner: City of Bydgoszcz
- Length: 5.4 km (3.4 mi)
- Location: Bydgoszcz, Poland
- Coordinates: 53.1310°N 17.9481°E

Nakielska Street is a street in Bydgoszcz, Poland. It starts from downtown settlements to the limits of the city towards Nakło nad Notecią.

== Location ==
Nakielska street extends east–west, from Grunwaldzka roundabout and junction with Focha Street to the intersection with Łochowska street near the western border of Bydgoszcz. Its length is about 5.4 km. The street is one of the main thoroughfares leading to the center of Bydgoszcz, connecting the western neighborhoods of the city situated on the south side of Bydgoszcz Canal.

== History ==
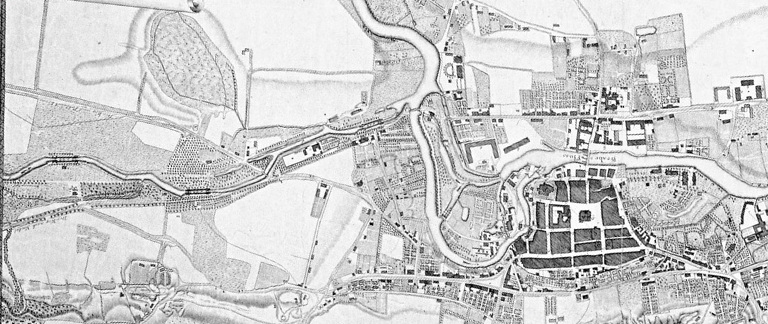
Bydgoszcz in 1800 - Lindner map

Nakielska Street is an old road connecting Bydgoszcz to Nakło nad Notecią on the west of the city. An early 19th century map of Bydgoszcz shows a path roughly matching today's street, which runs through the several estates: Wilczak, Miedzyń and the "Prondy colony". The path then led through Łochowo, Gorzeń, a bridge on Bydgoszcz Canal's 9th lock to Nakło nad Notecią. As such, the side plots of the future Nakielska Street comprised large farm lands.

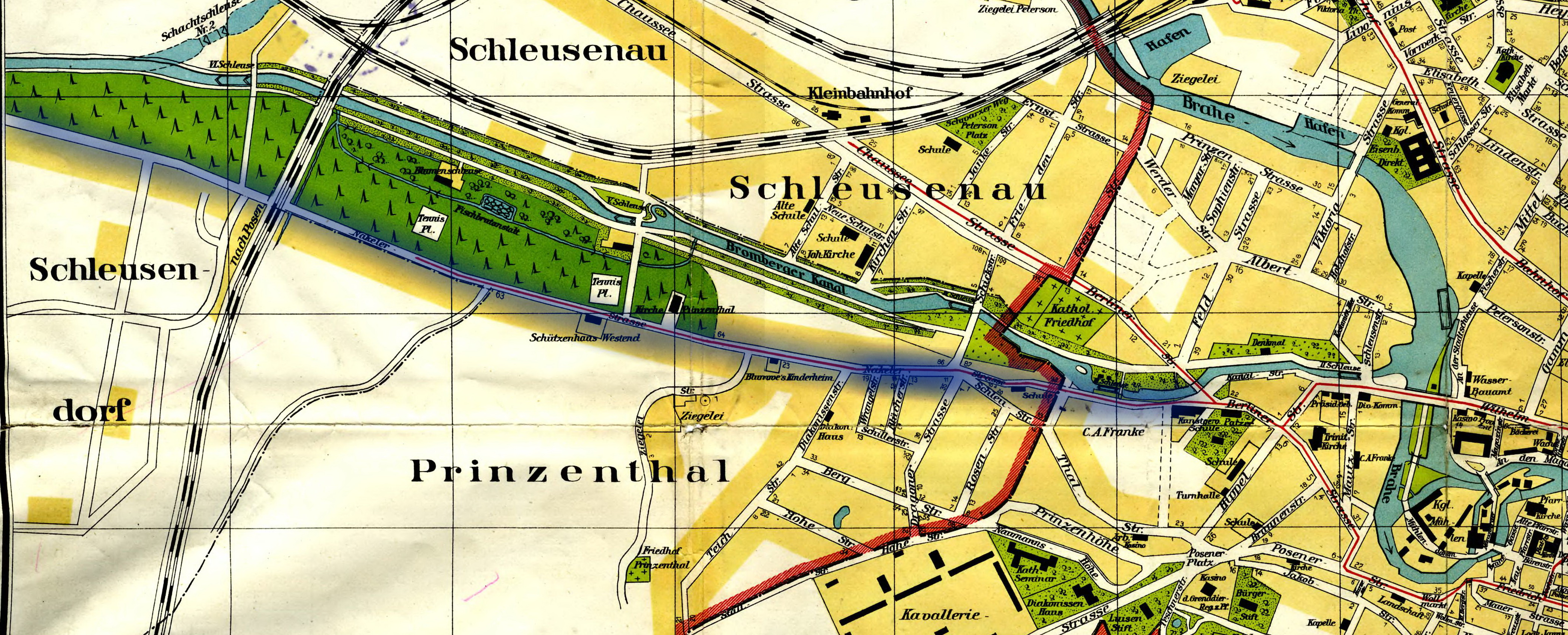
Nakielska street ca. 1914

An 1857 map of Bydgoszcz shows the path beginning at the intersection with Holy Trinity Street (then Berliner Strasse) next to the bridge over the canal, then entering the western suburban city of Prinzenthal. In 1872, a railway viaduct was built over the street for the line to Inowrocław (in 1897, the line extended to Żnin and, in 1908, to Poznań). After Bydgoszcz returning to Polish territory in 1920, suburban area, including Prinzenthal (today's Wilczak and Miedzyń) have been incorporated into the city administrative limits, making Nakielska street almost entirely part of Bydgoszcz. The final part was "acquired" during city border changes in 1954.

By the end of the 19th century, the street was paved, and the first buildings appeared on the eastern section.

The first street modernization after World War II happened only in the 1960s. Bitumen pavement was then applied from the railway viaduct to eastern city limits. In 1973, a roundabout was built over the filled portion of the old Bydgoszcz Canal, at the connection with Grunwaldska street.

Since 1990, few heavy renovations have been carried out on this thoroughfare, despite many projects and programs.

=== Naming ===
Through history, the street bore the following names:

- 1860s–1920, Nakelerstraße, as the path to Nakło nad Notecią (German: Nakel). Part of the city of Prinzenthal;
- 1920–1939, Ulica Nakielska, part of Bydgoszcz city territory;
- 1939–1945, Ludendorffstraße, from Erich Ludendorff;
- Since 1945, Ulica Nakielska (Nakielsak Street).

Current namesake refers to the city of Nakło nad Notecią, 30 km west of Bydgoszcz.

== Communication means ==
The first tramway line on Nakielska street was built in 1901, for the extension westward of third electric line, line "C" White, launched in 1900 from Theatre Square. Tram tracks were laid from Theatre Square to the crossing between Nakielska street and Czerwonego Krzyża street. In 1950, track lanes have been extended to the railway viaduct.

In addition to the street-car service, a bus line has been working since 1956 along Nakielska street.

The street is one of the heaviest traffic arteries in Bydgoszcz. In 2006, a measurement showed that during peak hours up to 1,100 vehicles were passing every hour. The most crowded section are the Grunwaldska roundabout and the intersection with Widok street.

== Main areas and edifices ==
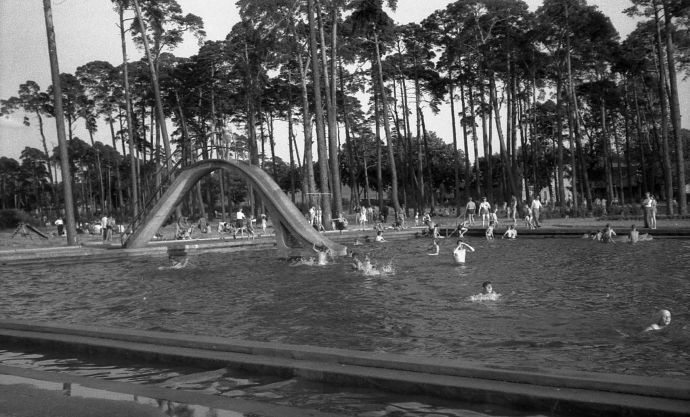
Old Swimming pool "Gwiazda Bydgoszcz"

Original buildings on Nakielska street were created on plots leased from farm owners. Modest one-storey houses from the late 19th century were soon replaced by tenement houses, with similar designs to ones in downtown. In 1927 Polish Red Cross, owner since 1921 of a farm plot, established a residential area connected to Nakielska street. This road, formerly named Jary, was then renamed "Czerwonego Krzyża" (Red Cross street). Most of the buildings have been built along "Nakelerstrasse", during the Prussian period, among which:

- The evangelical church of the Divine Mercy,
- A Protestant and a Catholic school,
- The villa at 47 (projekt from architect Fritz Weidner),
- The "Factory of Machine Tools for wood" and the associated Villa Carla Blumwe.

During the interwar period, the municipal stadium between the street and the Bydgoszcz Canal was created, allowing sports activities run by the newly established (25 April 1920) club "Gwiazda Bydgoszcz". In 1956, on its premises was inaugurated city's largest swimming pool: in a 4 hectares area were laid, among others, an outdoor swimming pool, children's pools, a solarium, changing rooms and food points. The recreation centre ceased its activity in the 1980s. The first marina on the Bydgoszcz Canal was built in 2009.

In 1961, the municipal Council extended the city boundaries to include in the west, inter alia, Miedzyń and Jary districts, making allowances for a few thousand plots allocated to individual construction. This extension allowed the construction of new schools, retail outlets and churches, such as the parish of the Blessed Virgin Mary of Mount Carmel (1980) and Parish Blissful Michael Kozal (1995).

=== Tenement at 1, corner with Miedza Street ===
1906

Eclecticism

This tenement was ordered by Rudolf Malchow, a rentier, who had been living previously at 3, which he owned too.

This corner building, now deprived of initial architectural motifs, still displays balconies and a modest topping spire.

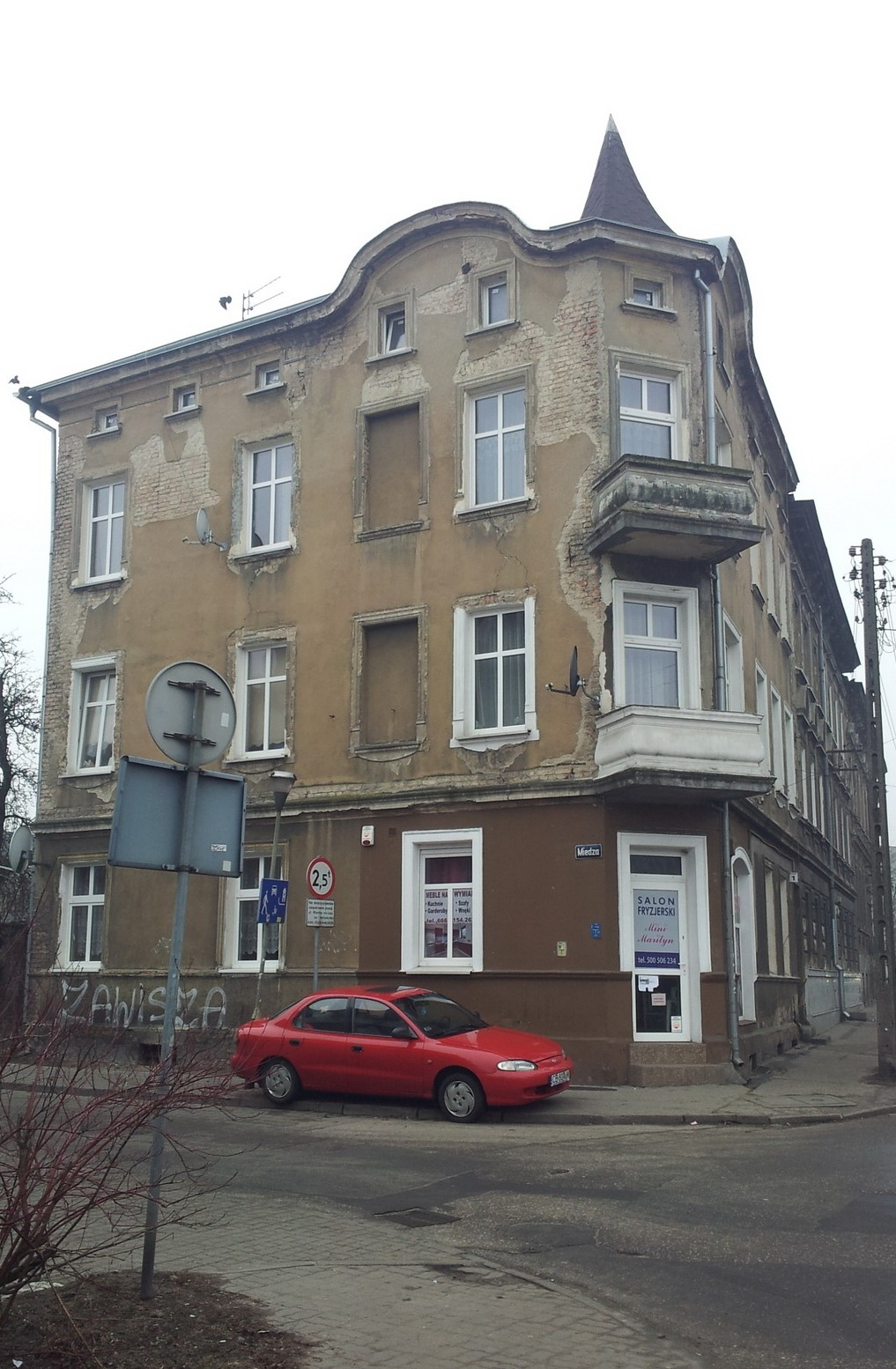
View from the street

=== Park on the Bydgoszcz Canal ===
Registered on the Kuyavian-Pomeranian Voivodeship Heritage List, Nr.601440, Reg.A/900/1-27, (30 November 2005

The park is located in the western part of the city just 2 km from the center. It extends on a narrow strip (100–300 m wide), but along a 3 km part of the old Bydgoszcz Canal and Nakielska street, making it the second largest park in Bydgoszcz (47 hectares).

Its creation is associated with the construction of Bydgoszcz Canal, the oldest in Poland, connecting Noteć and Brda rivers, thus being a link in the long waterway between rivers Oder and Vistula.

The Bydgoszcz canal was completed in 1774. On the section of Bydgoszcz, it is characterized by the need to overcome a 22 m high level gap, hence the need to build seven locks. Ernst Conrad Peterson was a channel inspector who came with the idea in 1802 to have the banks of the channel planted with trees to stabilize the unstable sandy soil: black poplars, alders, chestnuts, lindens, elms and beeches. In the days of Duchy of Warsaw (1807–1815) Napoleonic General Wincenty Aksamitowski planted rows of trees, today called "William polars", that are recognized as Polish Natural Monument.

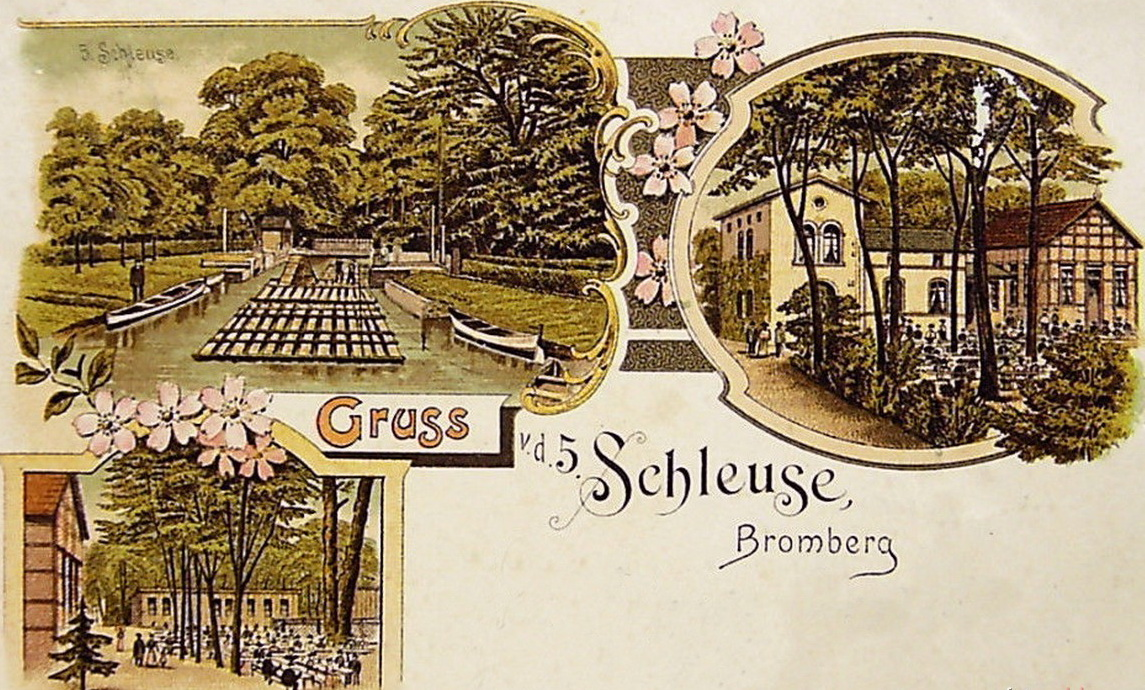
Bygoszcz Park canal postcard c. 1898

In the second half of the 19th century, the park on the canal became a citywide leisure and entertainment area: the first restaurant with a dance floor and a garden patio - Blumenschleuse ("the flower lock")- was built in 1838. In following years, private entrepreneurs opened there catering facilities and organized attractions: boat rentals, dances, exhibitions, summer theater, ice rink, etc. In this constant foliage and bushes area was unveiled in 1894 a monument to the co-creator of the canal, Franz von Brenckenhoff, in a form of a bust standing between the second and third lock. It was dismantled and moved to Piła in July 1919, after the decision to reintegrate Bydgoszcz to Polish territory. At the same time the Bydgoszcz Canal, was participating actively to the city business: countless rafts floated to the west, and locks were used age by barges, ships and even steamers.

In 1906–1915, a thorough reconstruction of the Bydgoszcz Canal led to excavate a new section (1.63 km long), with two new locks: consequently, the fraction along Nakielska street became abandoned and was used as a recreational area. This portion of the canal was then called "Old Bydgoszcz Canal". Nevertheless, it remained fully operational and was used twice afterwards: first in 1939, for Polish troops and shortly after World War II while one of the main lock was still out of order.

During interwar period, the park along the canal was a hallmark of Bydgoszcz, must-see in the touristic circuit of the city. Marshal Józef Piłsudski planted there a tree during his short stay in 1921.

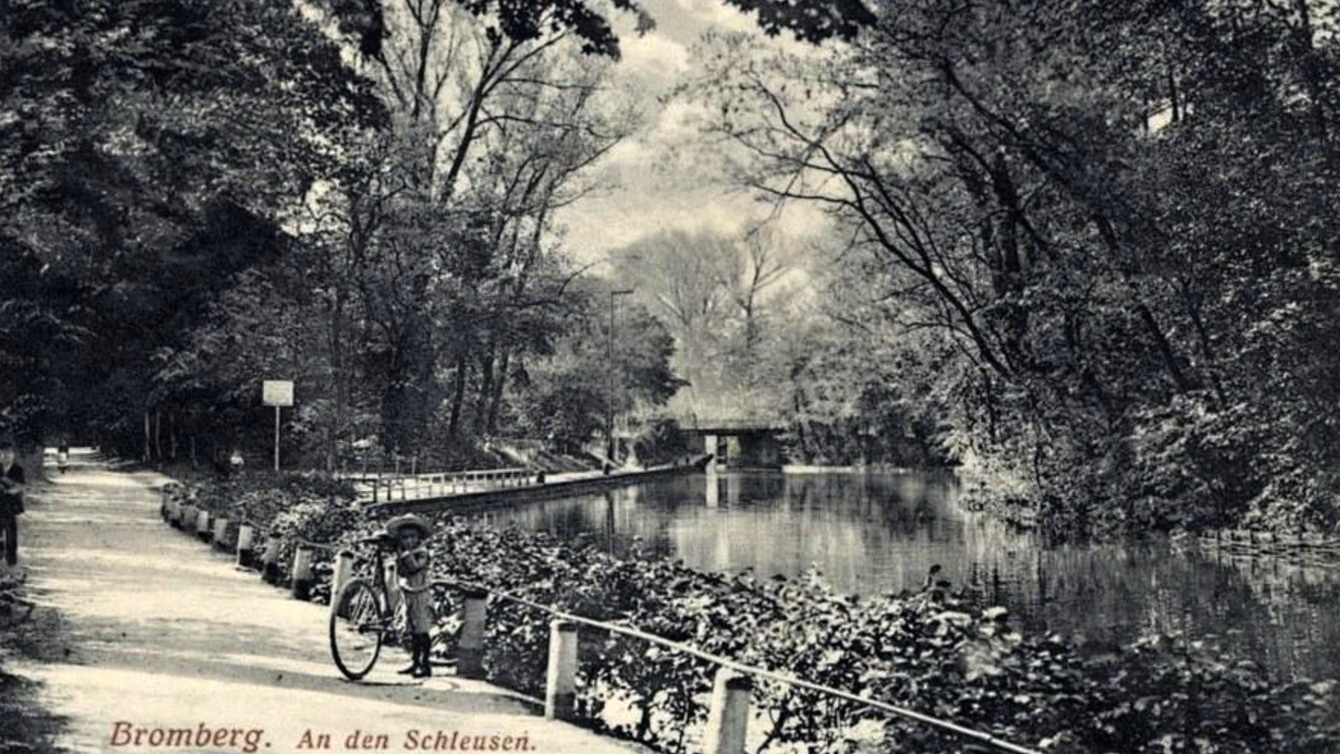
Park canal in 1908

A general reconstruction with embellishments was carried out in 1936: in the park, there were a dozen of restaurants, cafes, beer gardens, playgrounds for children, as well as tennis courts, and a 9 ha leisure complex founded in 1928 by Sejm member Idzi Świtała. The grounds were a propitious place for birds, with a lush vegetation: for 150 years, it has been considered as housing one of the largest colony of Thrush nightingales in Europe. Some of the oldest trees were seen as natural curiosities such as a 36 m high black poplar with a trunk circumference of 300–500 cm. The park started to become neglected in the 1960s, with the progressive expansion of Bydgoszcz and the unfavorable socio-economic climate: eventually, the old portion of the Canal became filled with rainwater and wastewater from the western part of the city. In 1970, the decision of the municipal council to dry and fill the eastern section of the canal was the last straw: 624 m of canal, together with two locks and a bridge were destroyed to widen the thoroughfare. This resulted in a decrease of the park area by one third, from 74 to 47 hectares, and for the Old Canal to become a dead branch, detached from Mill Island.

In the 1980s the future of the preserved section of the Old Canal came into question: several solutions have been considered, including a complete liquidation of the site. Finally, in the early 1990s, the choice was made to realize an acceptable reconstruction of the locks to clean the channel. A development plan of the Old Bydgoszcz Canal provided for the renovation of hydraulic equipment, the reconstruction of alleys and benches, the construction of playgrounds, and the maintenance of greenery. Three locks were renovated between 1992 and 1995, together with the interdiction of sewage releases, the set up of fountains in the mainstream and the creation of a 4 km long bike path. In 2004, at Nowogrodzka street 3, in a building owned by the High School Nr.3 "Adam Mickiewicz", the Museum of Bydgoszcz Canal was founded.

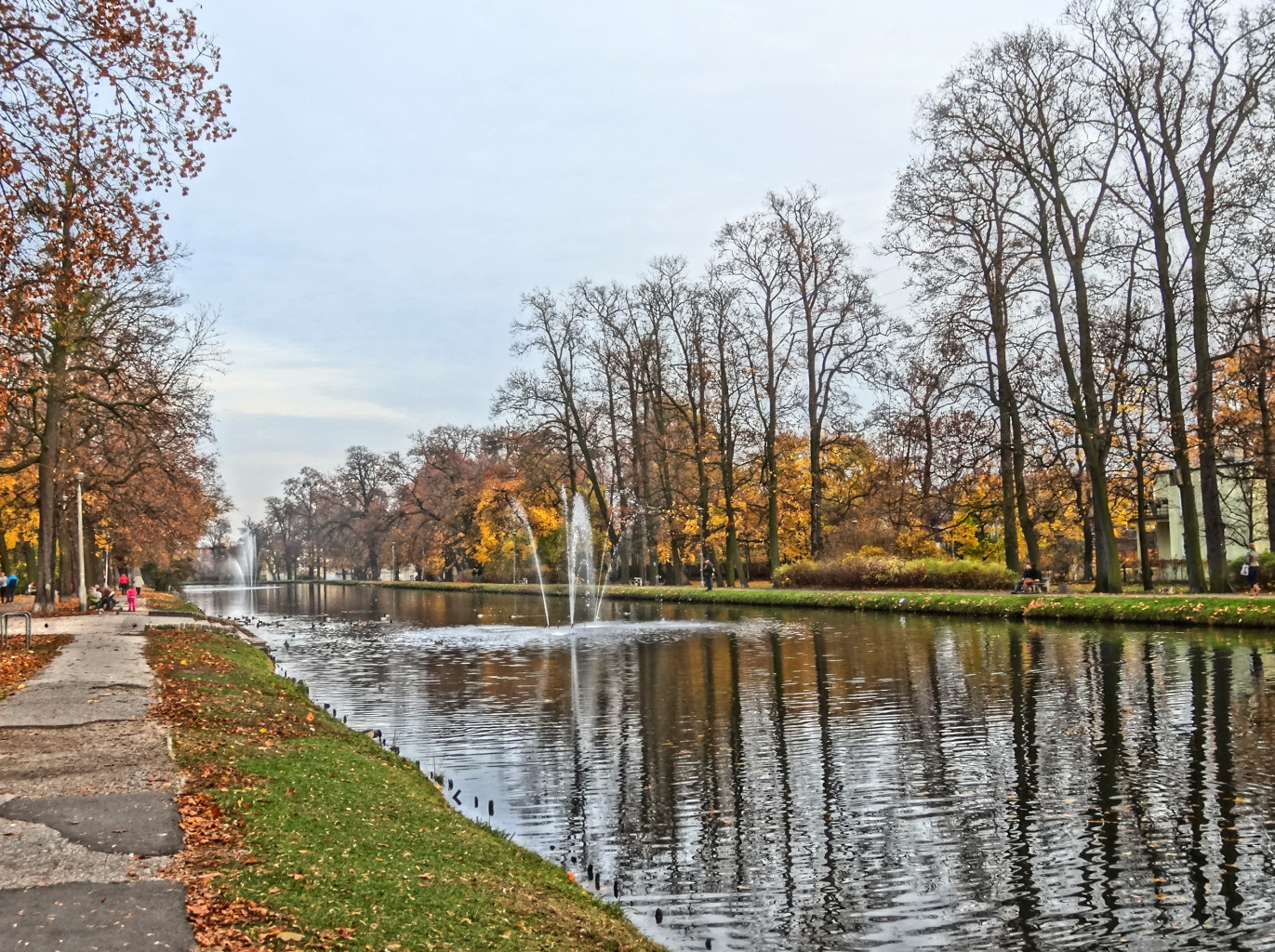
View of the main stream with fountain on

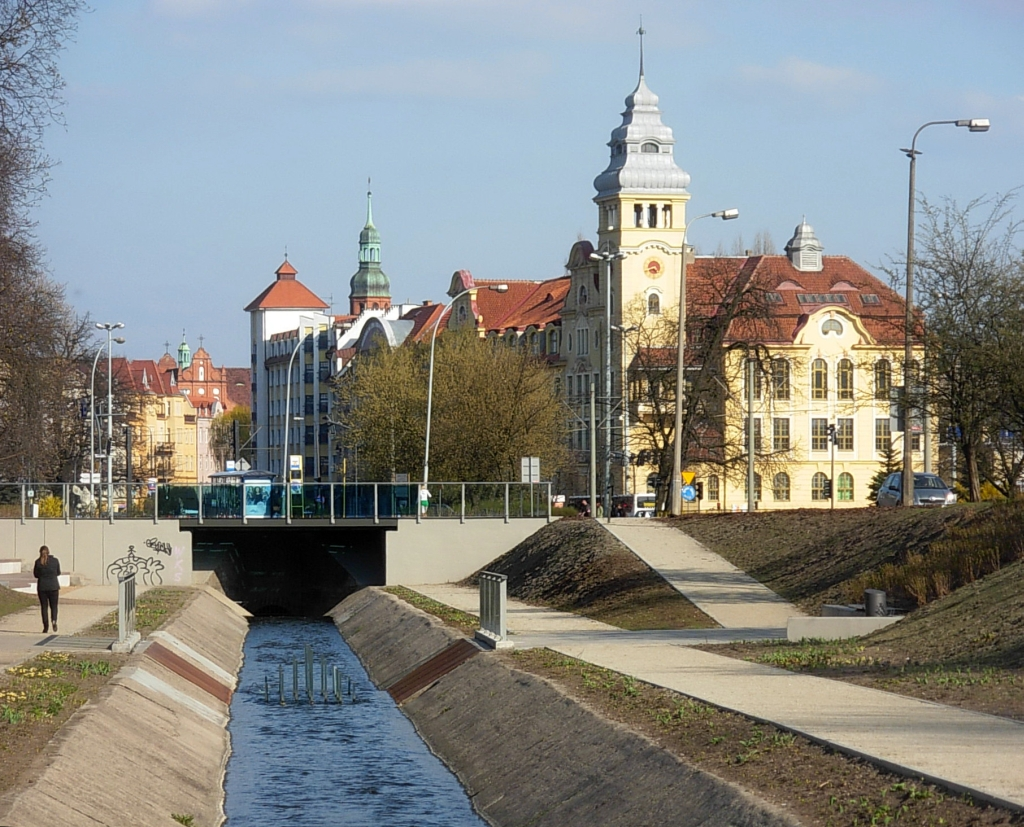
End of open air section

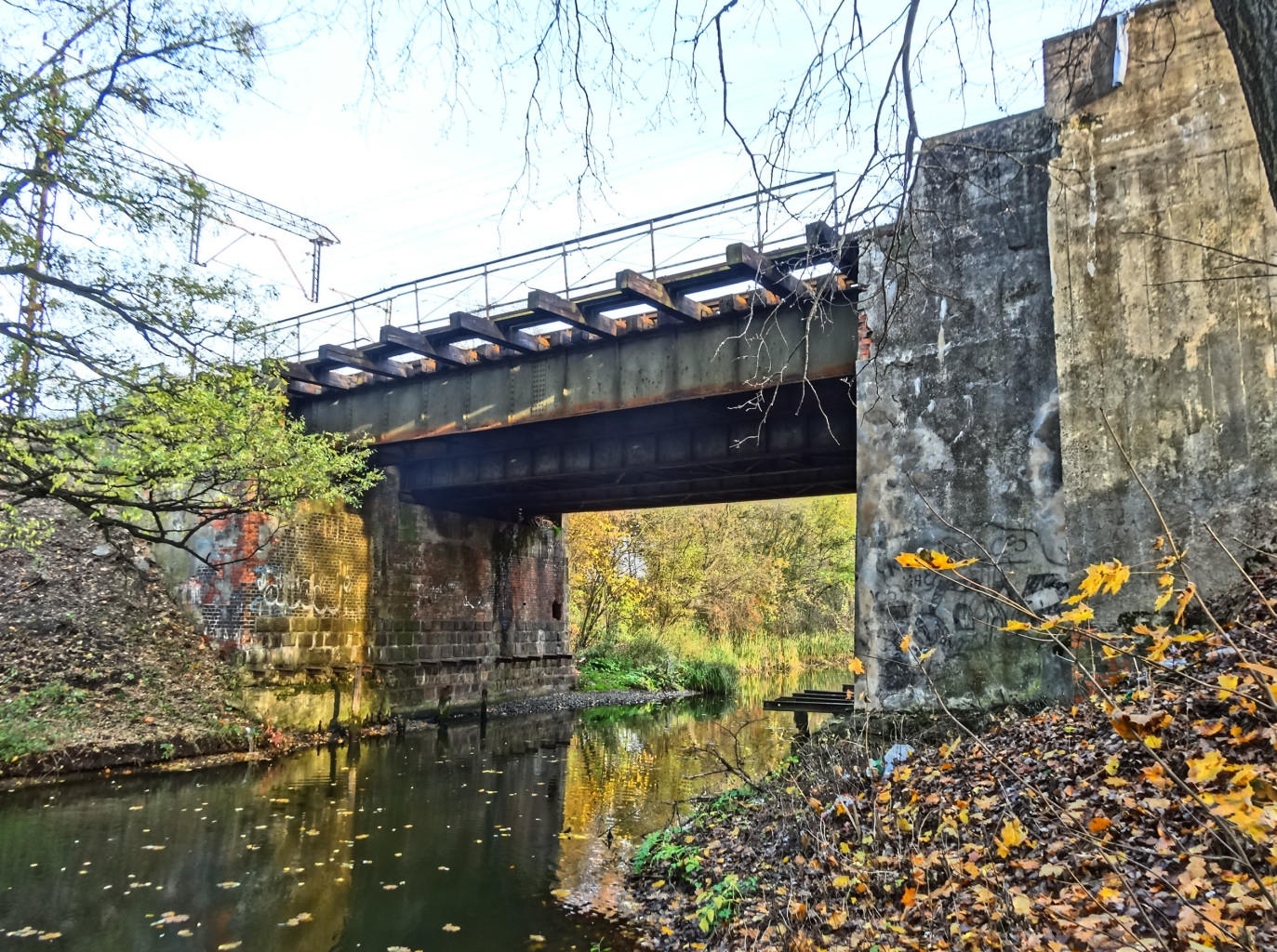
Railway bridge over the canal

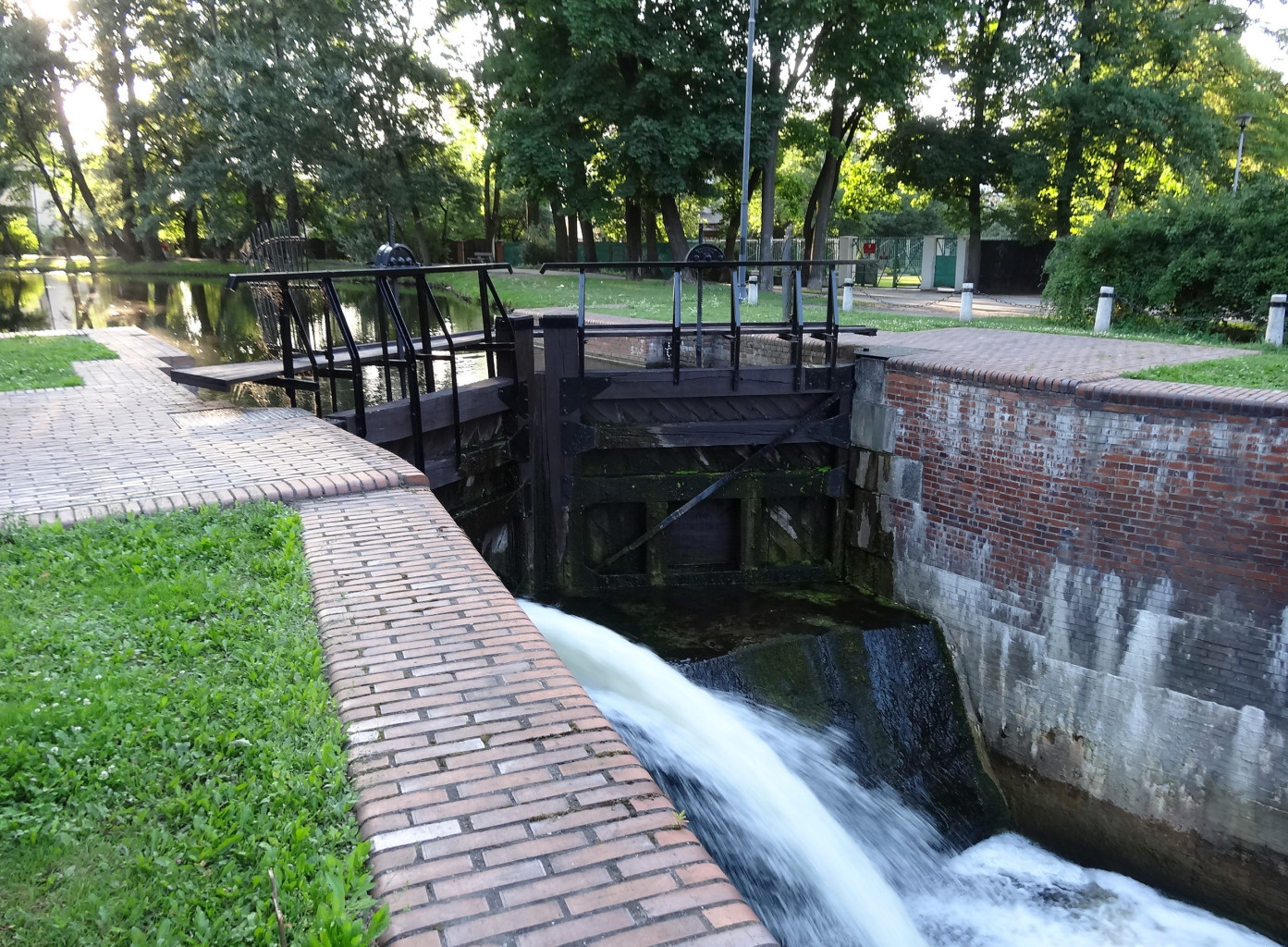
Lock Nr.4

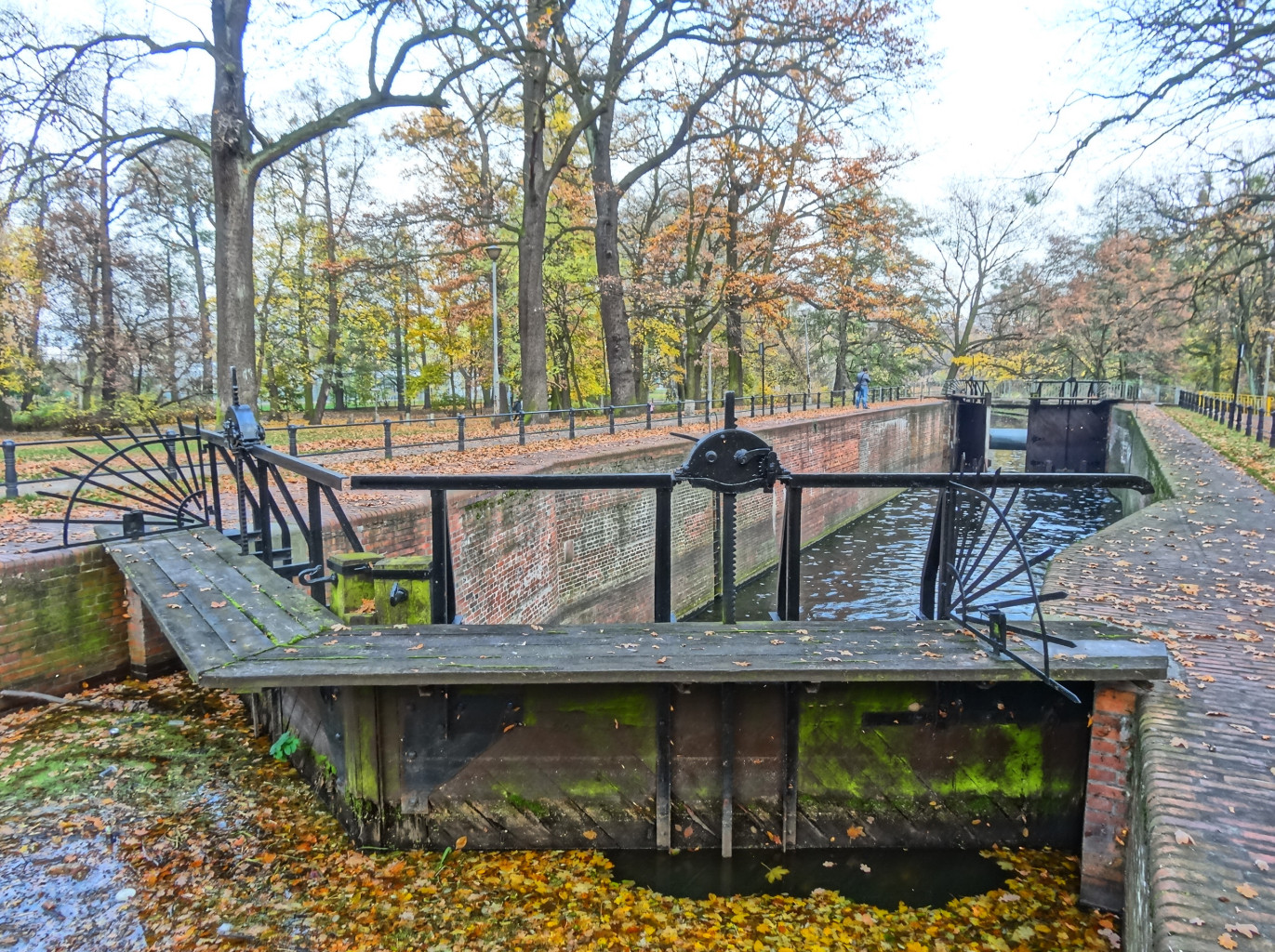
Lock Nr.5

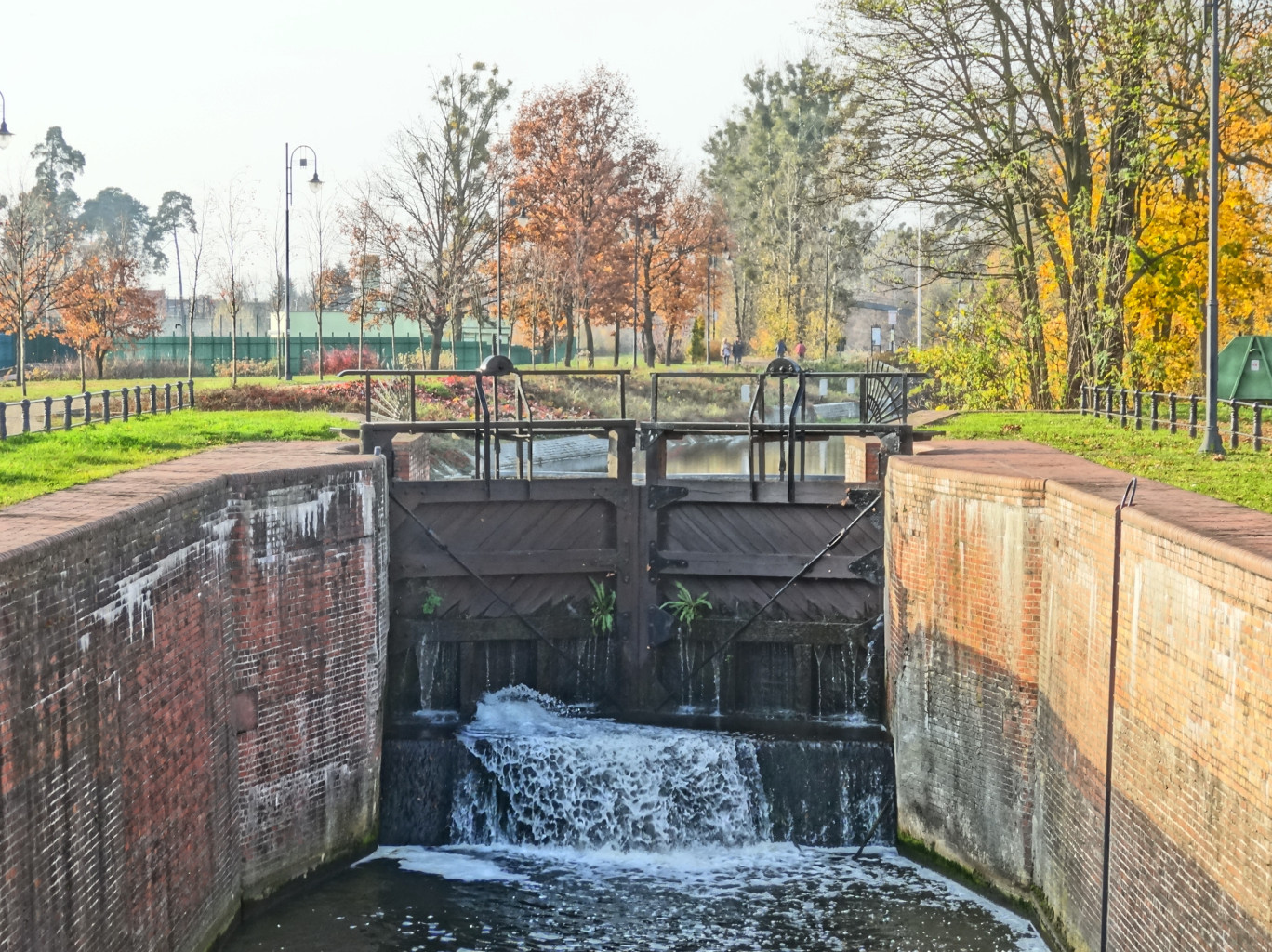
Lock Nr.6
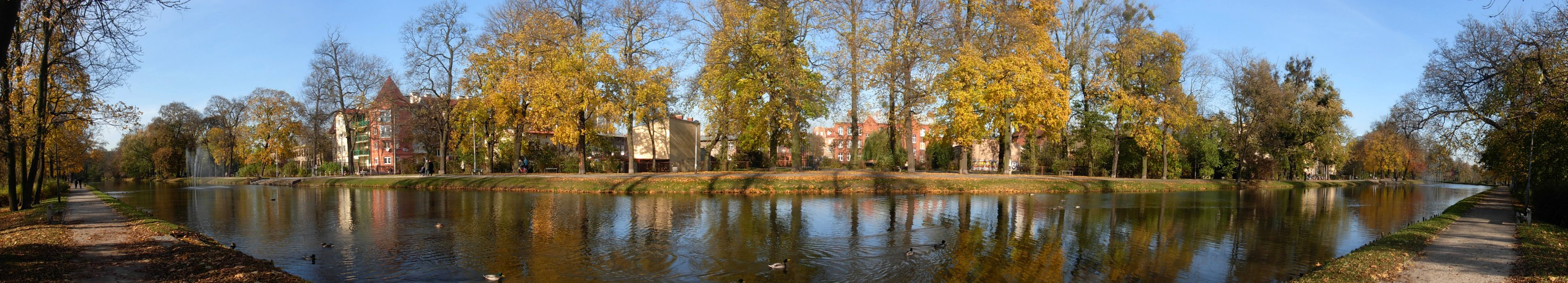
Panorama at the middle section of Old Canal

=== Max Mellin's Tenement, at 2 ===
1890

Eclecticism

This tenement, initially at Nakeler Straße 92, was commissioned by Max Mellin, a butcher. In 1893, it moved to the hands of Hugo Liptau, a merchand, who opened there a restaurant, Bellevue, and ran it till 1920. In the 1920s, Feliks Hajek became landlord of buildings at 2 and 4.

The tenement is damaged and needs overhaul to boast its neo-classic features. Both buildings (Nr.2 and Nr.4) were located on the bank of the Bydgoszcz Canal until its filling to expand Nakielska and Focha streets in the 1970s.

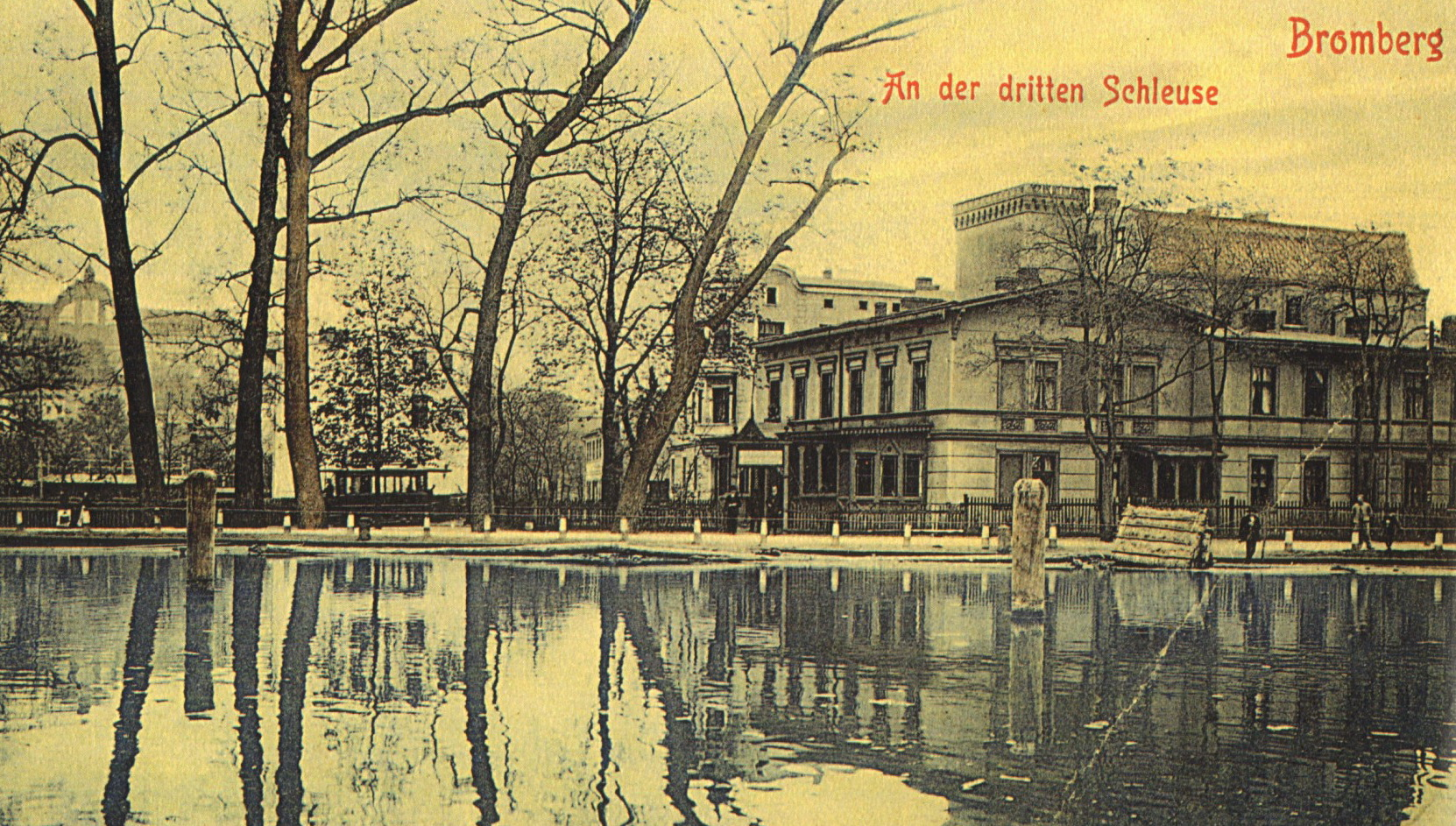
View of Nr.2 (left) and Nr.4 (right) from a postcard ca 1905

=== Tenement at 3 ===
1890

Eclecticism

This tenement, initially at Nakeler Straße 2, had Rudolf Malchow, a rentier, as first landlord. He moved to newly built tenement at 1 in 1906, still owning building at 3.

The tenement displays a typical eclectic architectural facade, with bossages, pediments and corbel table at the top.

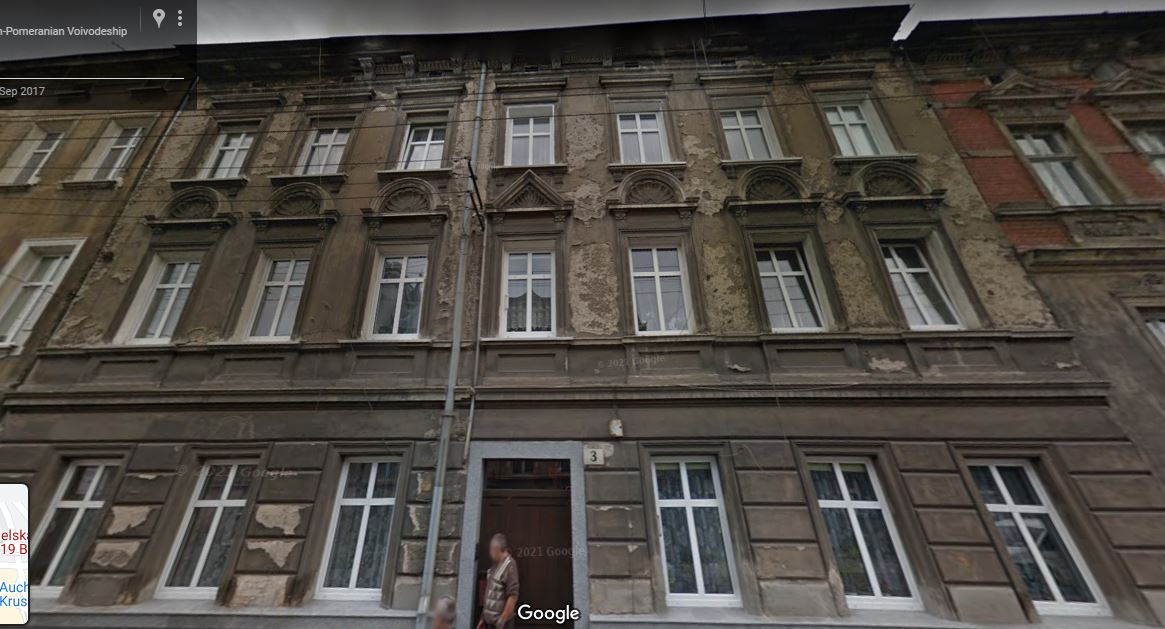
Main elevation

=== Tenement at 4 ===
1904

Eclecticism

The building, originally at Nakeler Straße 91, was associated with abutting Nr.2 for a long time. Built at the end of the 19th century, it since became the property of the landlord of Nr.2, restaurateur Hugo Liptau, till the end of the 1910s.

Though weathered by conditions, the facade still has visible details including:

- An adorned carriage entrance, crowned by a bear head;
- A large door entry flanked by pilasters;
- Pedimented and festooned windows;
- Shed dormers topped with finials;
- A square crenelated white tower overhanging the right extremity of the frontage.
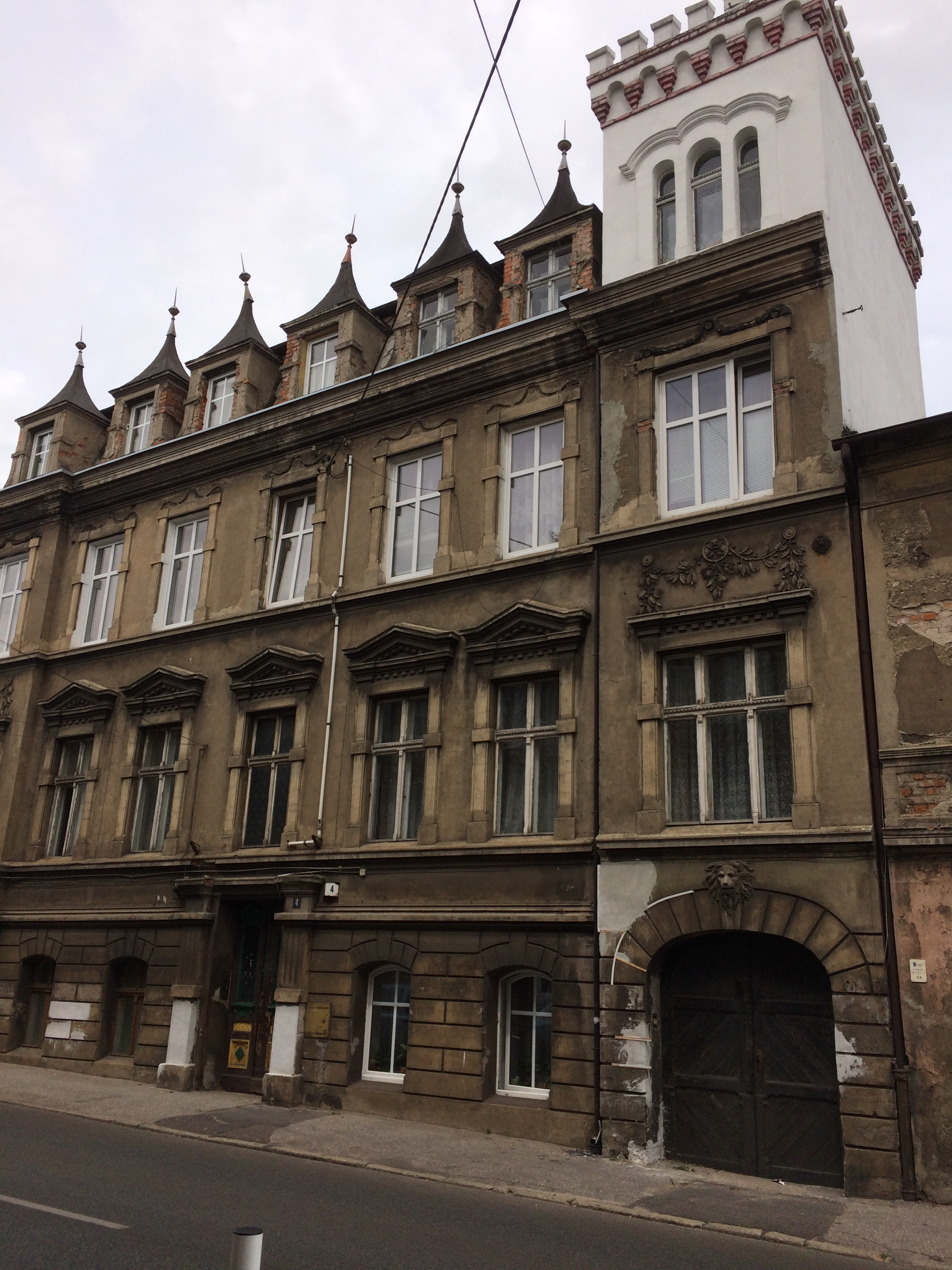
Main elevation

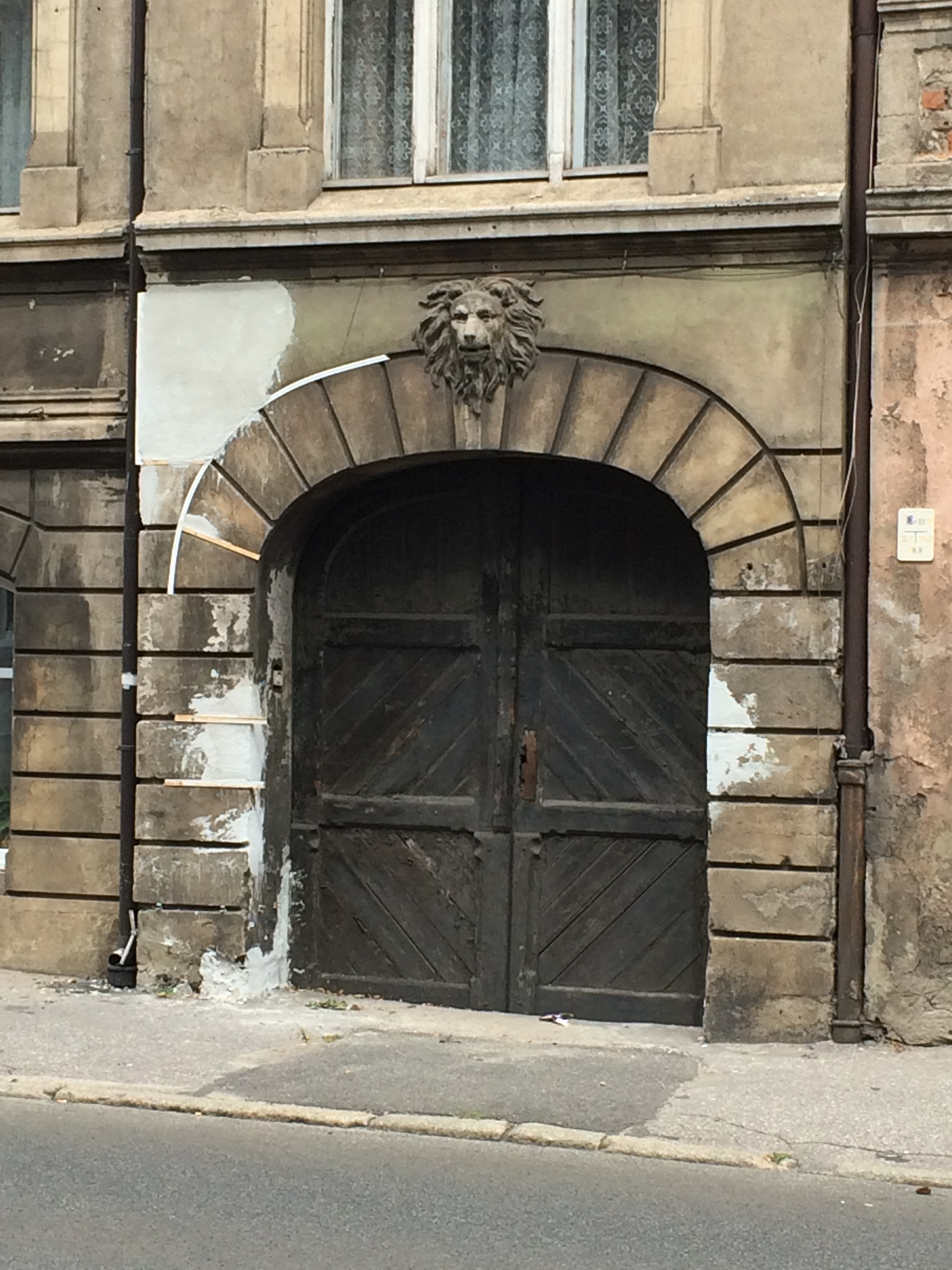
Carriage portal

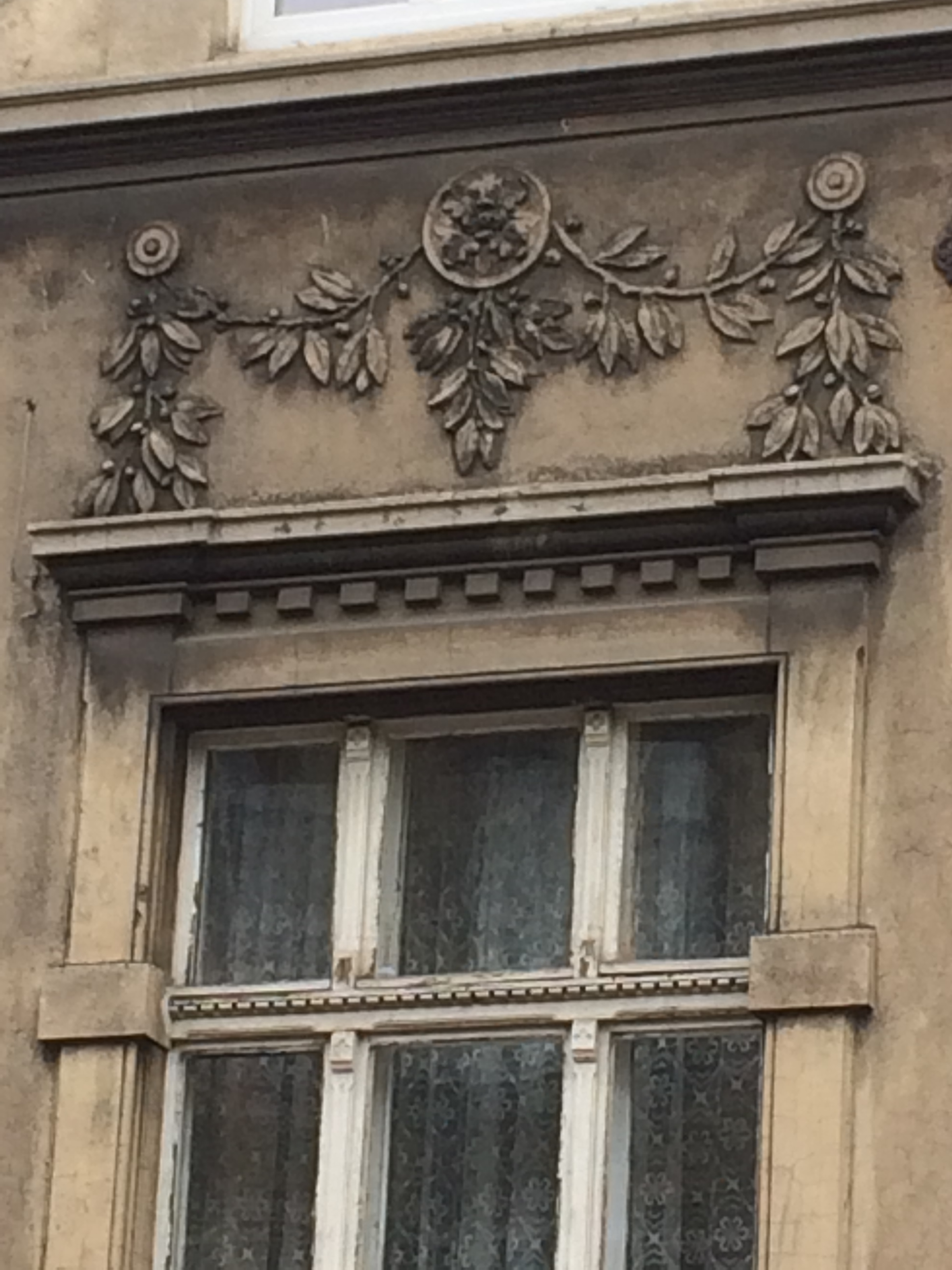
Festoon decoration

=== Tenement at 5 ===
1904–1910

Eclecticism

Initially at Nakeler Straße 3, the tenement was first owned by a merchant, Hermann Blumenthal, and soon (1890) moved to the property of Ferdinand Seegebarth, a retiree, till the end of the Prussian period.

The main elevation on the street still exhibits:

- Adorned openings with cartouches a pediments;
- The entry door decorated with pilasters, a lintel displaying a female figure and garlands;
- A corbel table.
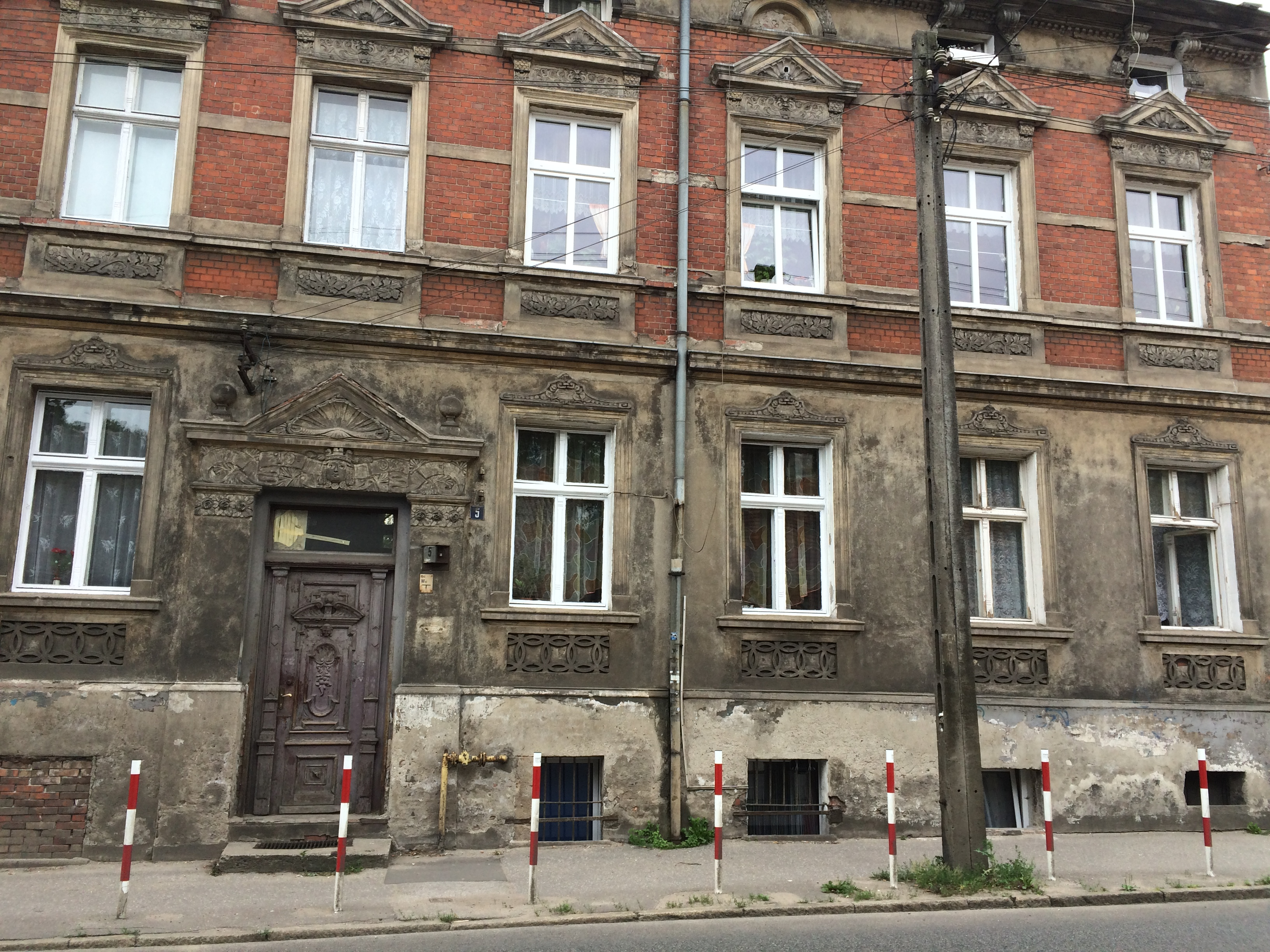
Main elevation

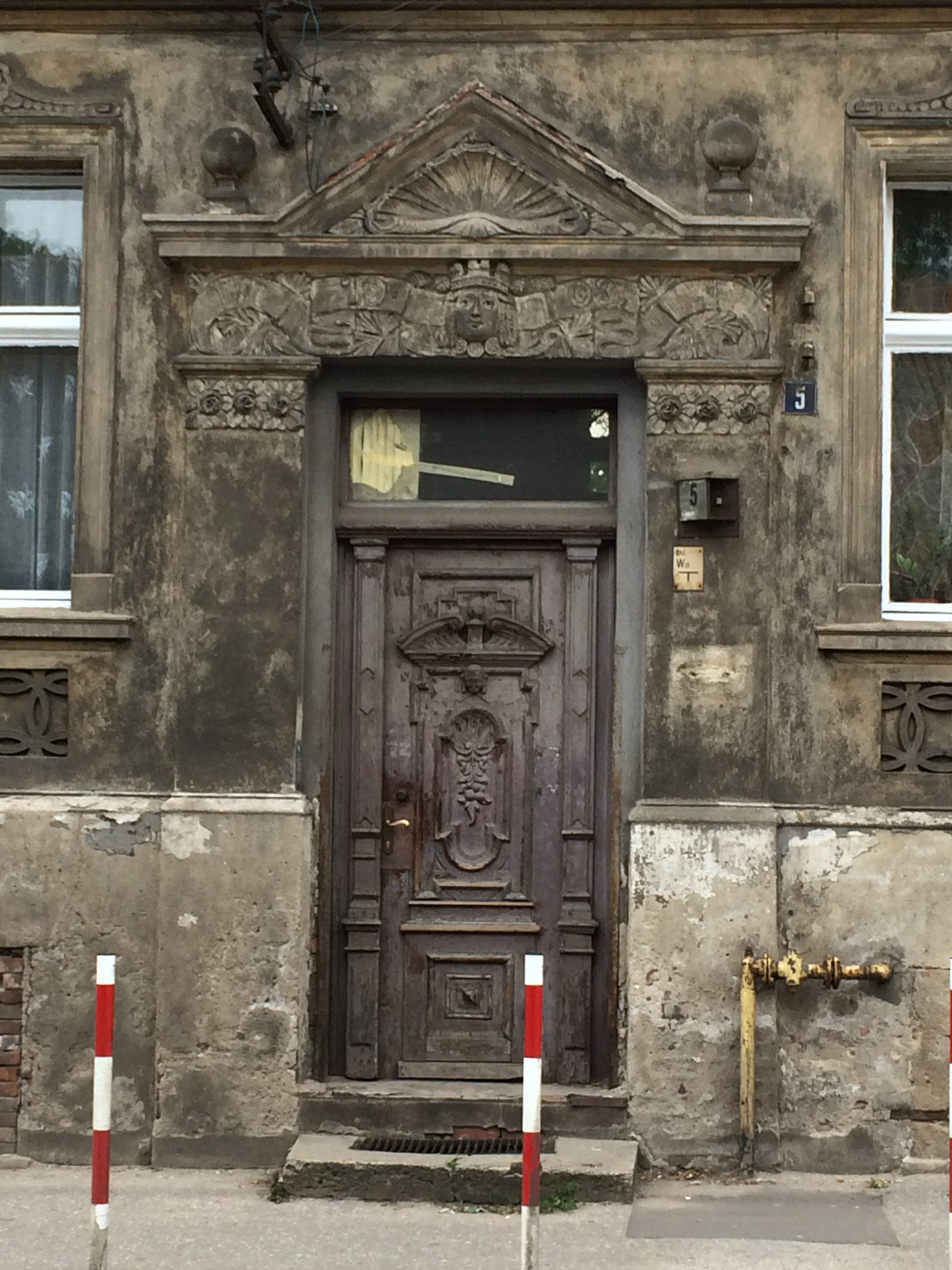
Portal

=== School complex Nr. 1 (Polish: Zespoł Szkół Nr 1-ZS 1), at 11 ===
1888, 1914

German Historicism

Since its erection in the late 1880s, the tenement has been devoted to education. Initially a Municipal School (German: Schulehaus der Gemeinde), it has been working till the start of World War I, during which the building was almost uninhabited (only the rector lived there). At the re-creation of the Polish republic, the city owned the complex for its one use (Polish: Magistrat miasta) during ten years, before running there a new school Polish: Szkola Powszechna in the 1930s.

After World War II, the ZS1 took over educational activities for adults from High School Nr.1 located at Plac Wolności. On 11 November 2003, the school received its patron name, "Bartłomiej of Bydgoszcz" (c. 1480–1548), from a local Bernardine scholar which life is associated with Bydgoszcz. After a thriving activity in the 1970s and 1980s, with activities refocused on vocational studies, the number of pupils decreased dramatically in the 2010s, from 1146 in 2000 to 272 in 2016. Decision was taken to move ZS1 activity to another location in the city (Fredry street), for new school year 2016/2017.

The main building on the street displays a typical German historicist style. Two gabled avant-corps border the main entrance, the rest of the complex being on the side off street, with several smaller buildings delineating the playing yard.

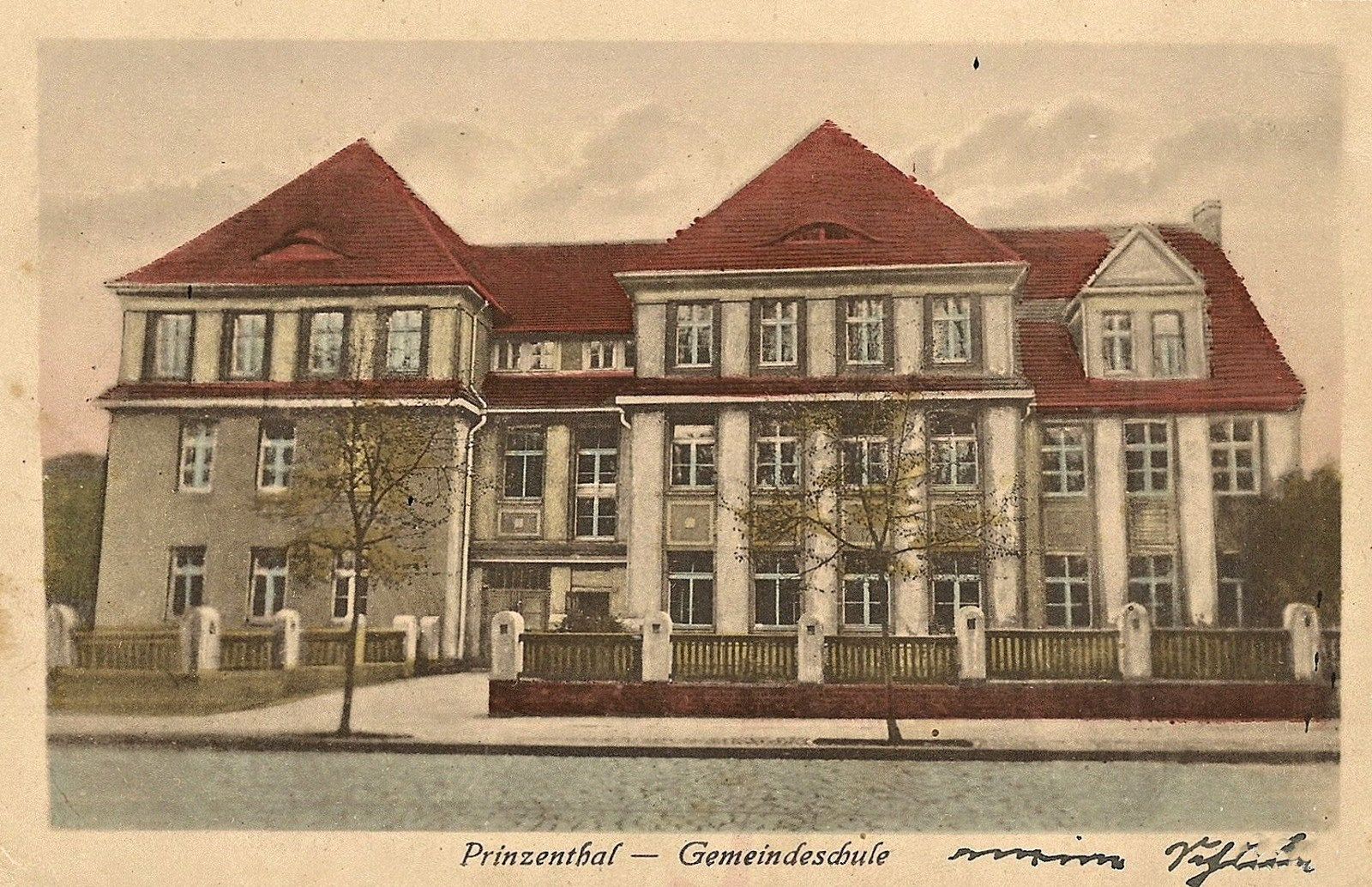
View of the school building ca 1907

=== Tenement at 17 ===
1907–1908

Early Art Nouveau

Initially at Nakeler Straße 9, the place was first a store for wood, managed by Hermann Blumenthal Jr., then in 1900, it was changed to a housing building with the same owner.

Recently renovated, the main elevation reflects the first influences of Art Nouveau. The main door is adorned with a stylized female figure with floral and vegetal motifs, in addition to the sun-ray shaped transom light. Two wrought iron balconies overhangs the entry. Between the second and third floor, large cartouches display floral details, stylized masks and festoons. The facade is crowned by a last woman figure, symbolic of the Art Nouveau movement.

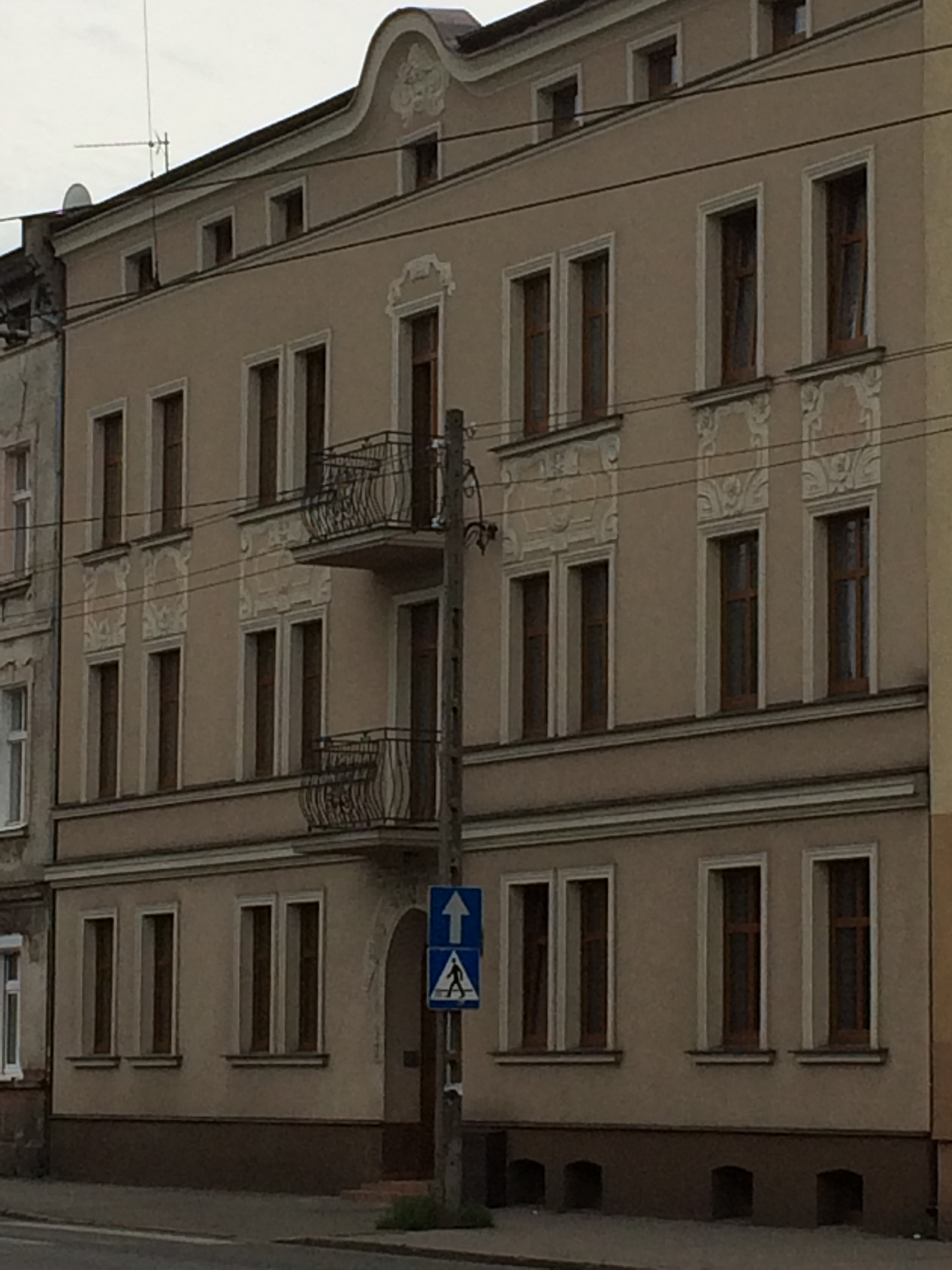
Main elevation

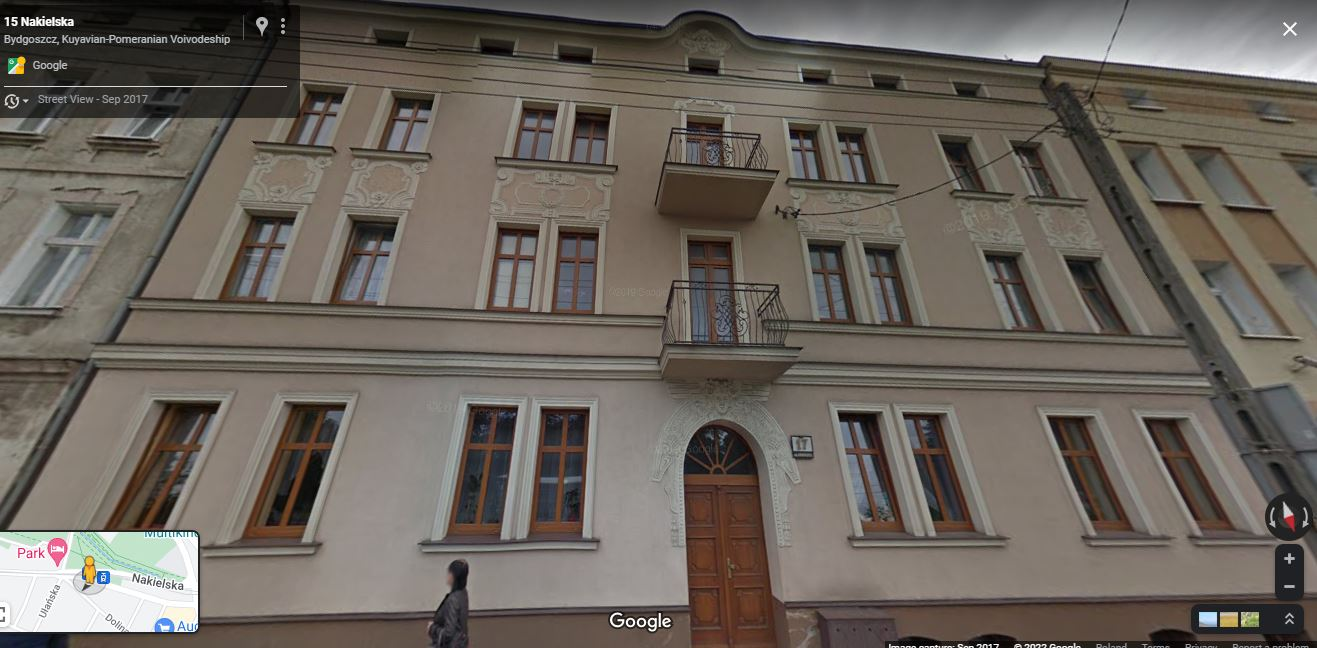
Facade on the street

=== Adolf Müller's tenement at 21, corner with Dolina Street ===
1907–1908

Art Nouveau

Initially at Nakeler Straße 10a, it was commissioned by Adolf Müller, a painter, together with abutting building at 19. In the 1910s, a doctor, Salko Marcus, practiced there.

Main elevations reflect the influences of Art Nouveau style. The frontage on Dolina street is bare of architectural details. The main entry on Nakielska street is adorned with a stylized woman figure embedded in floral motifs. On the first floor, windows possess vegetal-shaped pediments. On the top, a frieze runs all the way, at the foot of shed dormers, an ogee gable and the thin onion dome.

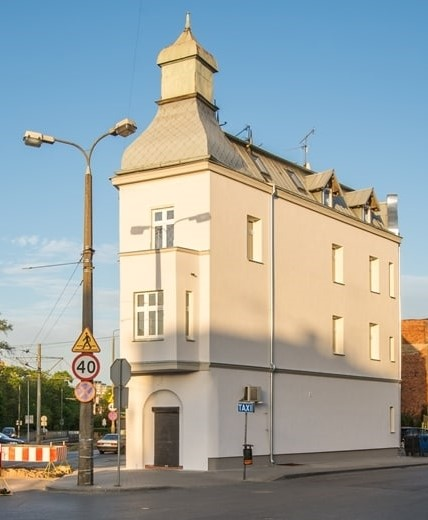
Corner view

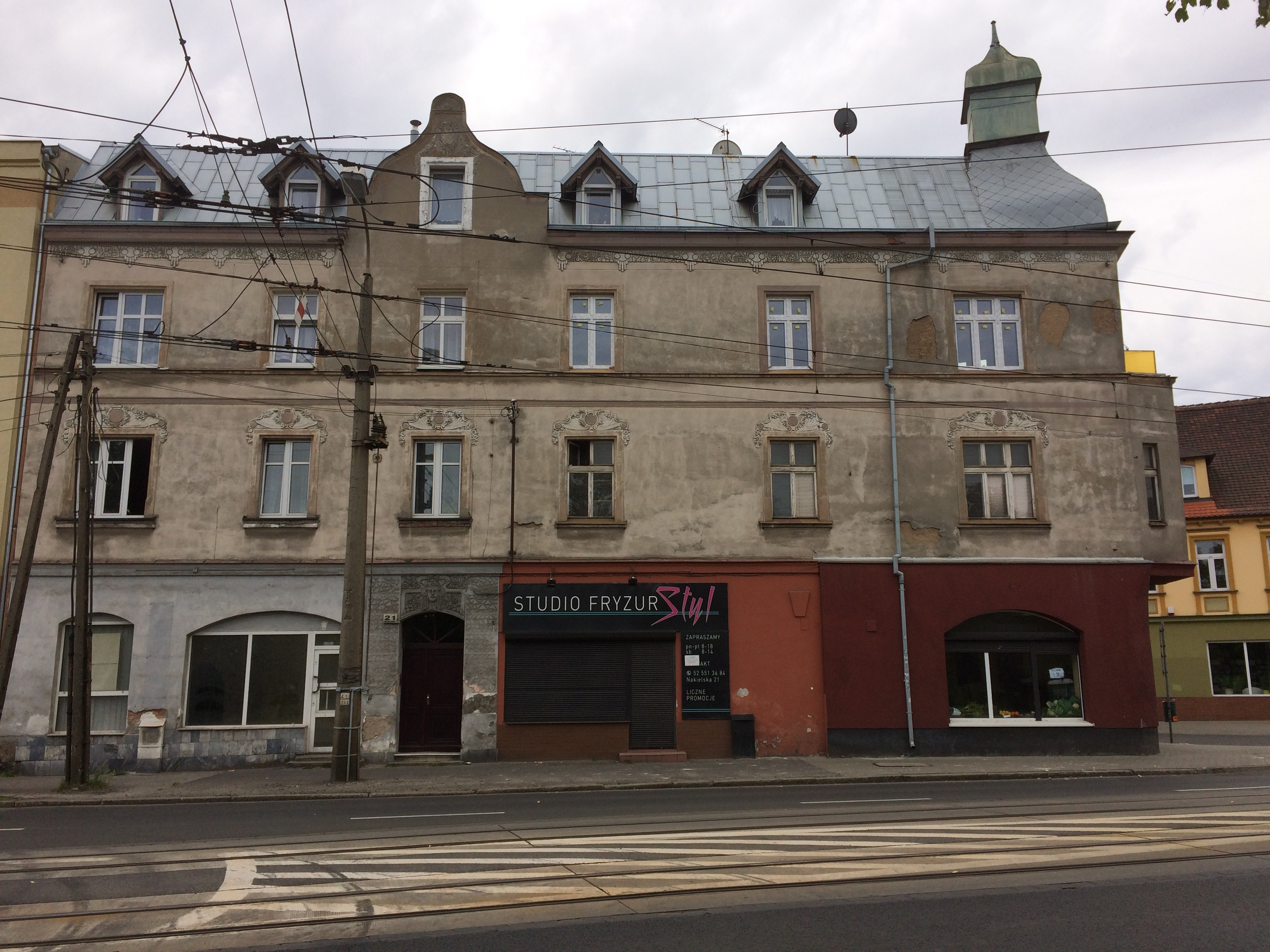
Facade onto Nakielska street

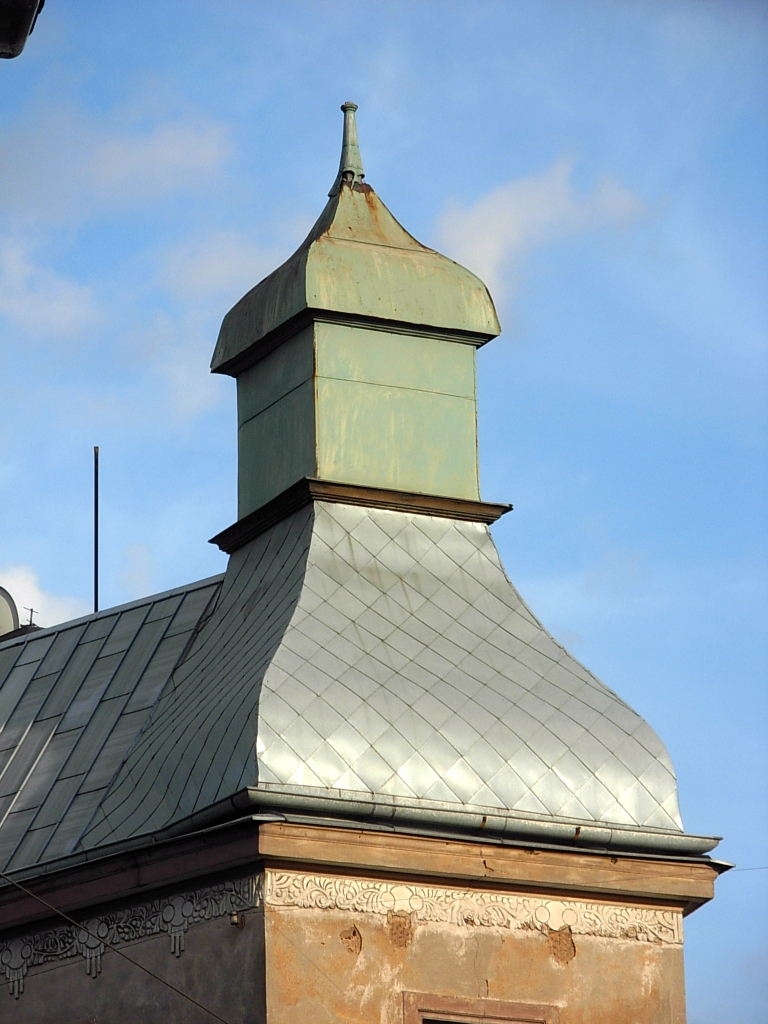
Detail of the frieze and the onion shaped spire

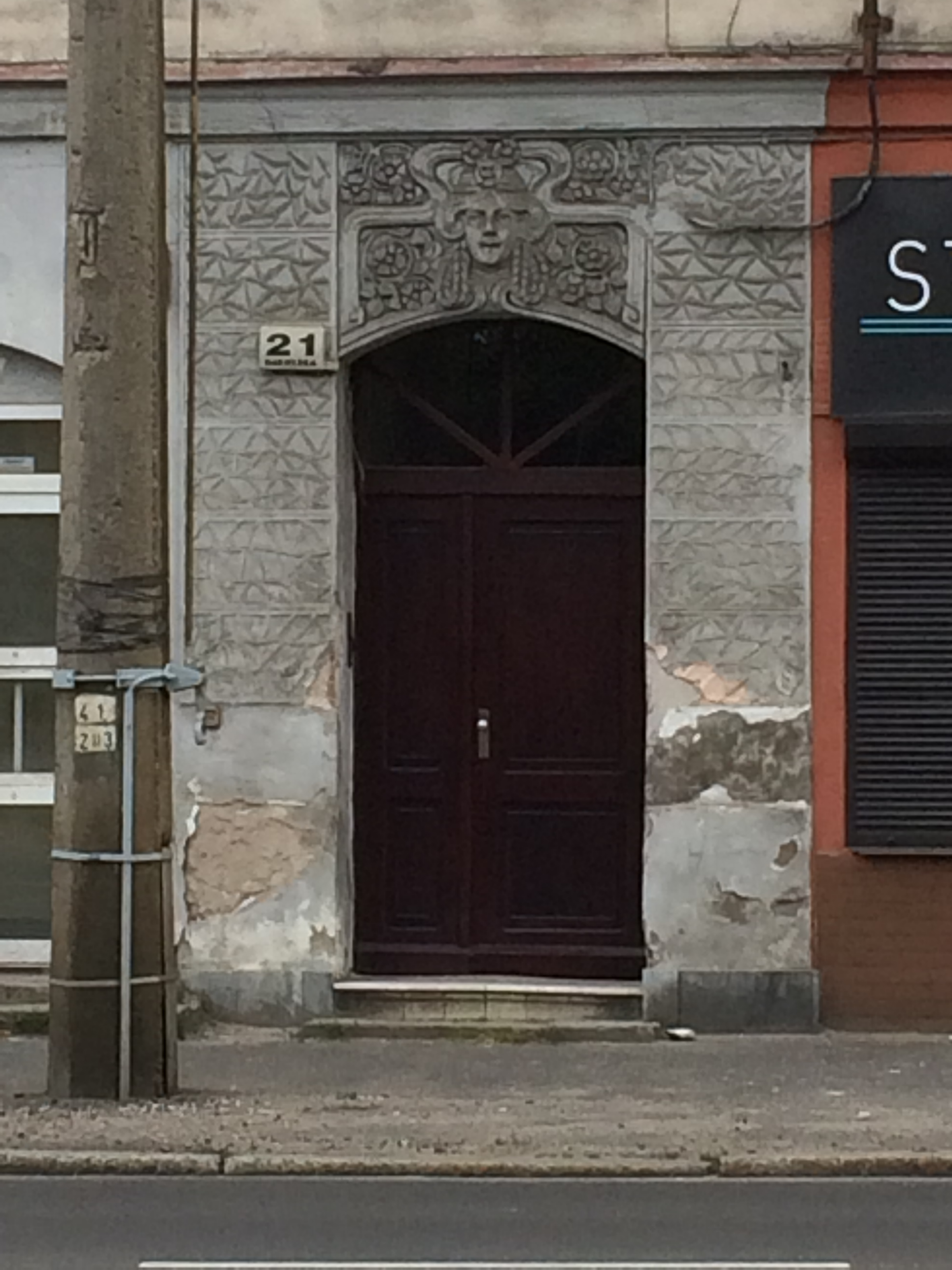
Detail of the portal

=== Mural on building at 22 ===
At crossing with Wrocławska street, this mural was unveiled in May 2018, part of the annual celebration of the Kuyavian-Pomeranian Voivodeship (Polish: święto województwa).

It depicts Polish Pope John Paul II looking out of the window of St. Peter's Basilica in Rome.

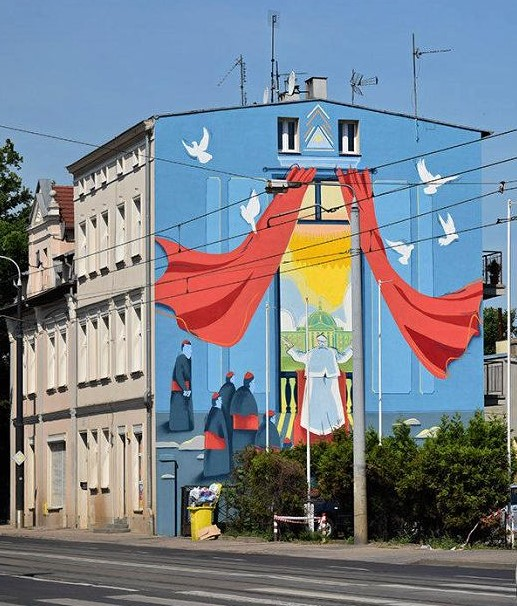
Mural at 22

=== Tenement at 23, corner with Ułańska street ===
1895

Eclecticism

The tenement was first owned by a mason, Franz Kuklinski: at the time, his address was simply Prinzenthal 24. His family has kept the building in their ownership till the start of World War II.

The large facade on Nakielska street, albeit bare from architectural details, displays a symmetry and balance inherent to neoclassicism.

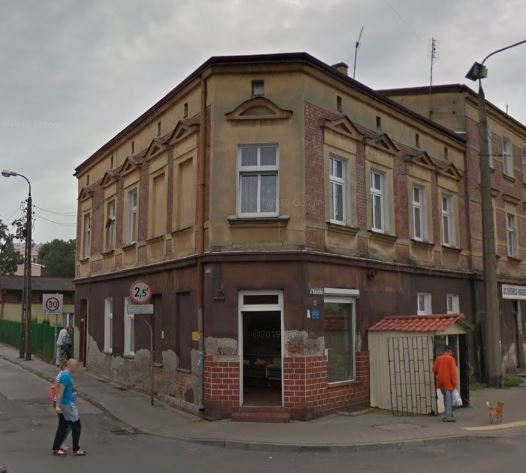
Main elevation

=== Tenement at 24 ===
1894

Eclecticism, elements of Neo-Baroque

The tenement's first landlord was Franz Kaczmarek, a postman.

The elevation on Nakielska street offers its upper part to the view: first floor is flanked by pilasters crowned by ornamented corbels. A heavy gable dormer sticks out from the roof: it possesses Neo-baroque elements, such as a decorated triangular pediments and ball finials. The building complex covers also a part offset from the street, with a garden.

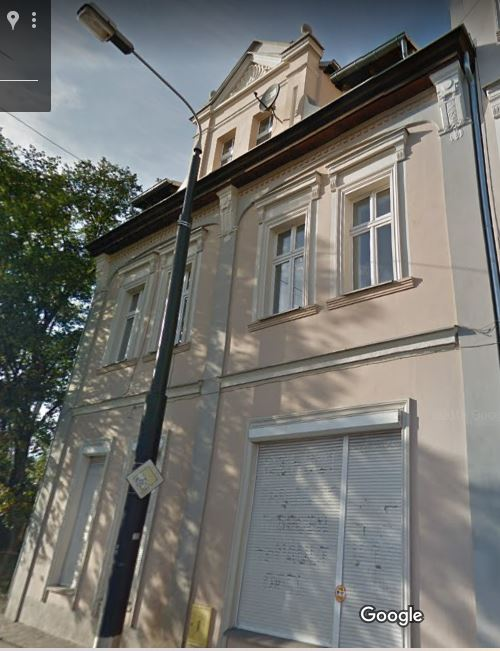
Main elevation

=== Tenement at 25 ===
1895

Eclecticism

The building was part of the earliest wave of constructions in the street. Hermann Eggert, a blacksmith, was the first landlord of the tenement in the third quarter of the 19th century, referenced as Prinzenthal 26.

The renovated facade displays, in a niche on the first floor, a statue holding of the Roman goddess Fortuna with a cornucopia, as an allegory of success and abundance. The other architectural details left comprise a carved wooden door, some bare cartouches, pilasters and lintels framing windows on the first floor and corbels on the top of the elevation.

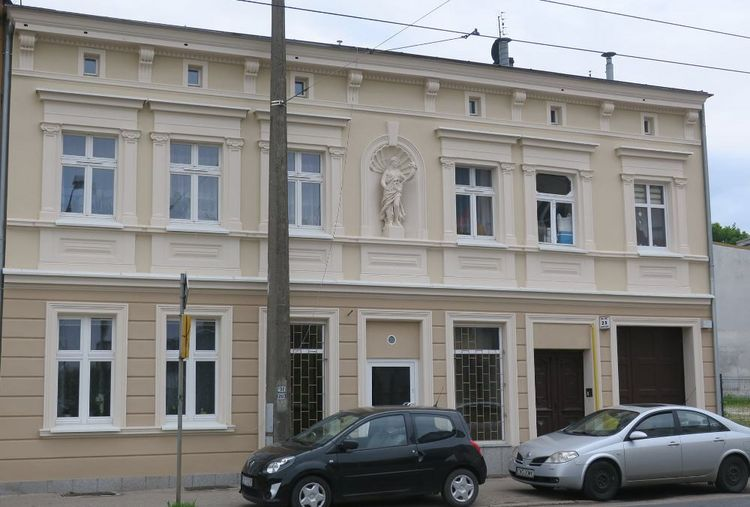
Main elevation

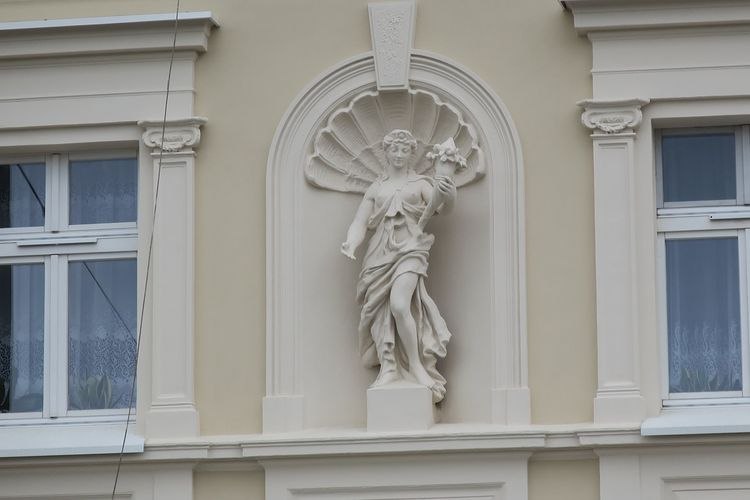
Goddess Fortuna

=== Tenement at 29, corner with Czarnieckiego street ===
1897–1898

Eclecticism

The tenement was first owned by Hermann Blumenthal Sr., a merchant: at the time, his address was simply Prinzenthal 28. Hermann Sr. did not live there, but Nr.31, which he possessed also.

Facades on both Nakielska and Czarnieckiego streets have been restored in 2017, and allowed to highlight the rich original architectural decoration, with pediments, bossages or cartouches inherent to this period.

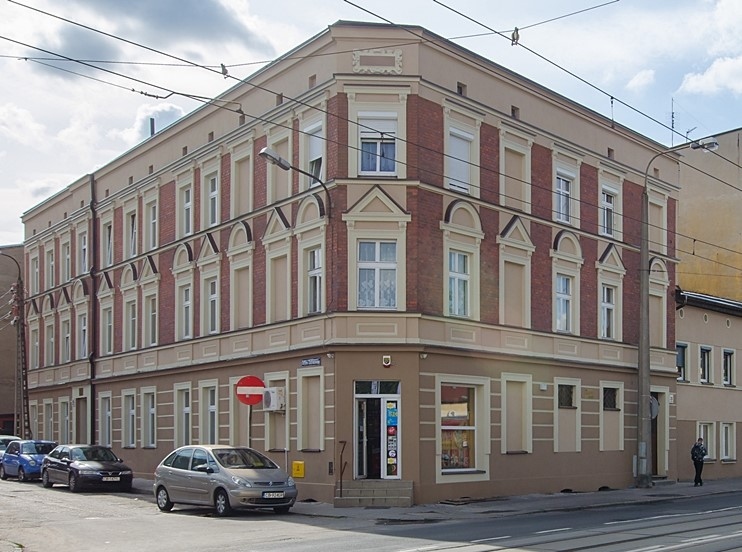
View from Nakielska street

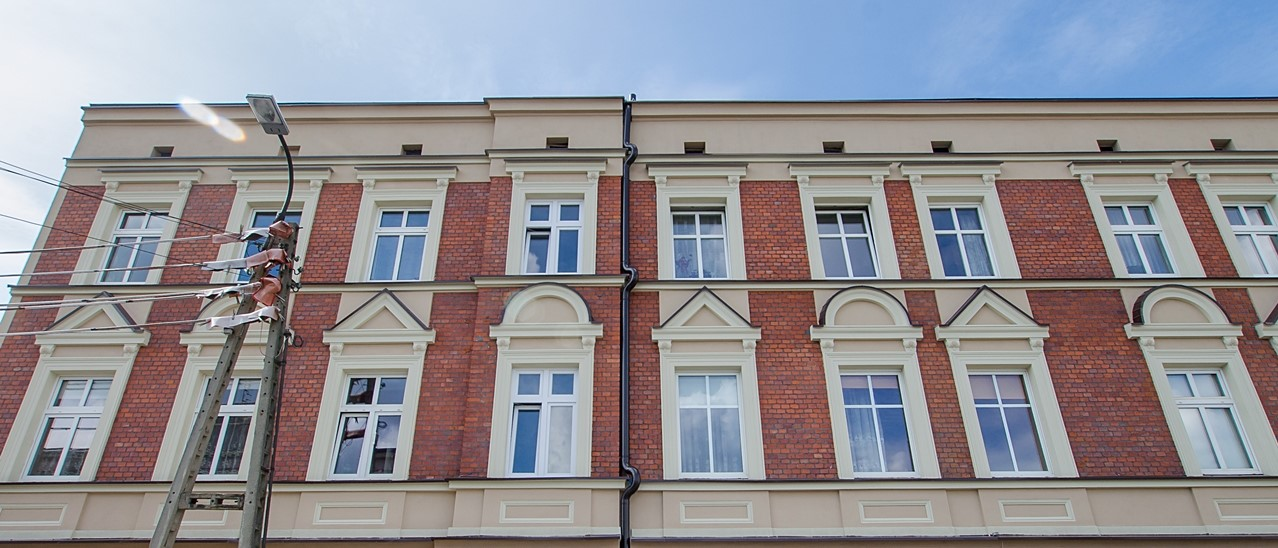
Facade details

=== Georg Niederführ's tenement at 31 ===
1906–1907

Art Nouveau, Eclecticism

While the plot has been constructed since the 1880s, Georg Niederführ, then landlord, had the tenement rebuilt in 1907. He lived there till the early 1920s.

On the massive facade are damaged cartouches, a large vertical motif, the adorned portal and the curved gable mentioning the time of erection.

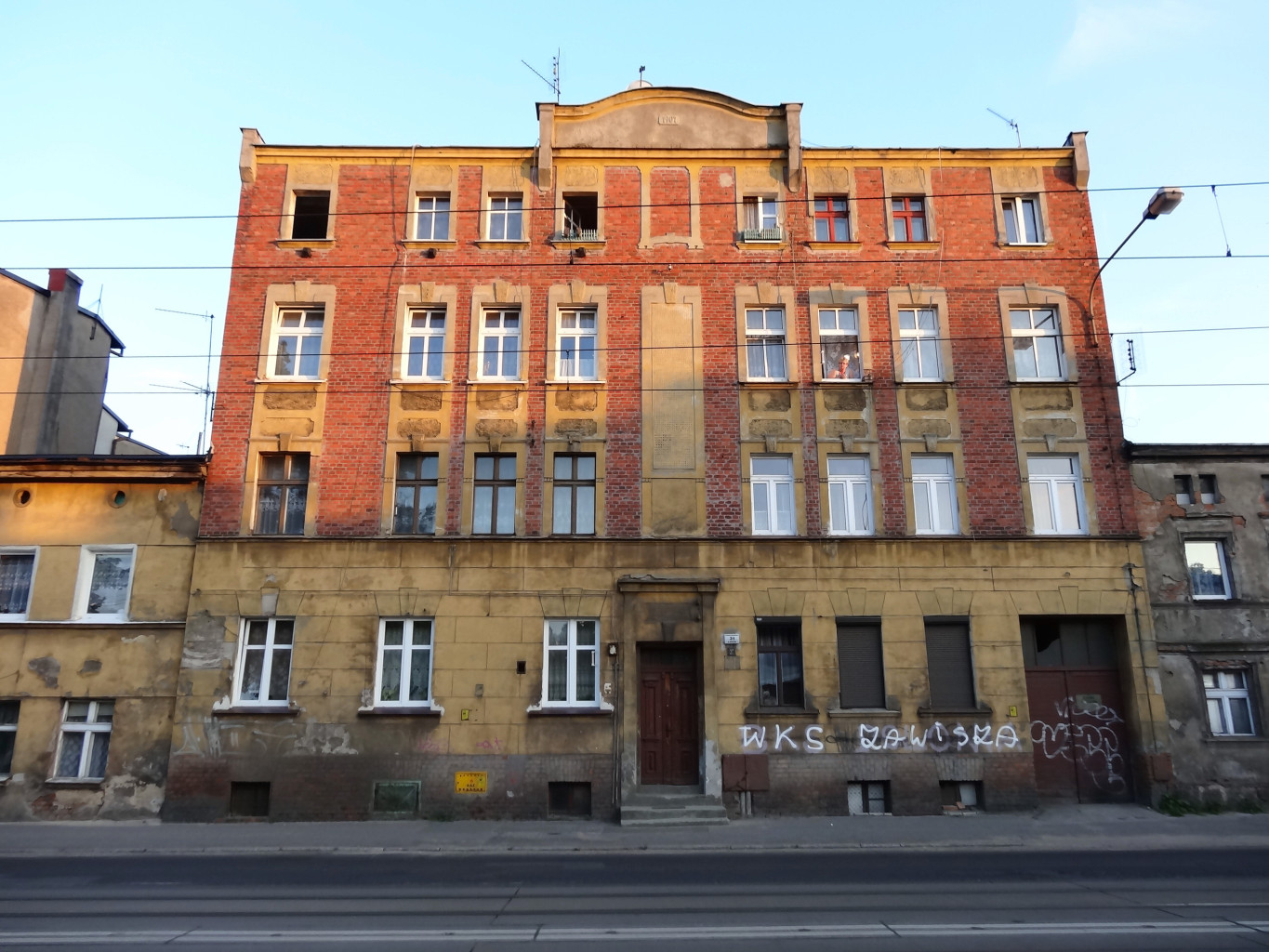
Main frontage on Nakielska street

=== Schliep tenement, at 35 ===
1906

Art Nouveau

The plot has been constructed since the 1880s, but in 1906 Johann Schliep, then owner, had the building reconstructed. He lived there till the early 1920s.

The massive facade mirrors its neighbour (Nr.31). They both have one or two floors more than the surroundings houses and thus easily stands out on this side of the street. On the ground floor facade of 35, windows are round-top, and both the main entry and the carriage entrance are delicately decorated with festoons and Art Nouveau–style woman figure. The upper levels display garnished cartouches and lintels, as well as vertical bossages. Round top gable encapsulates the date of construction, 1906.

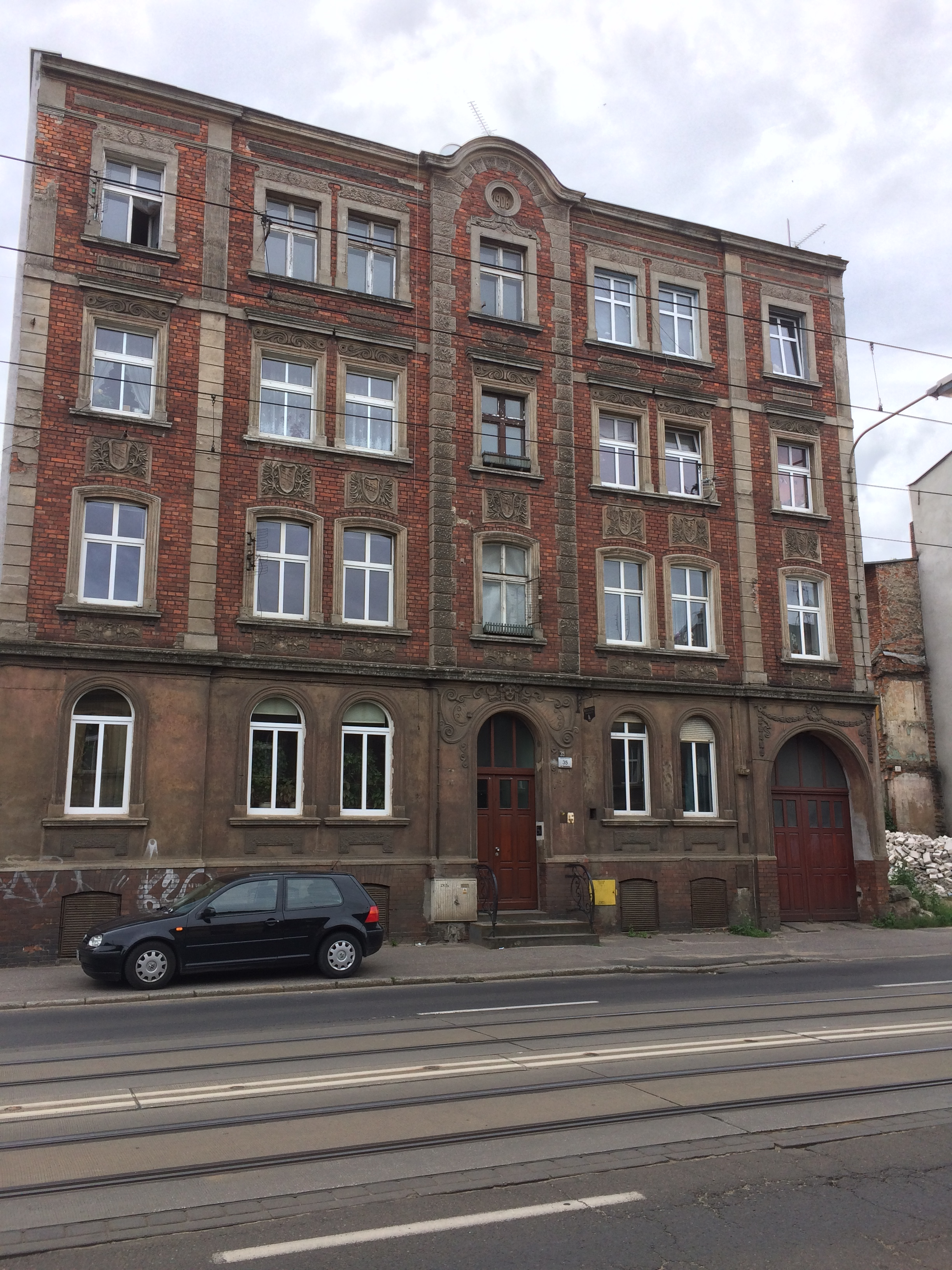
Main frontage on Nakielska street

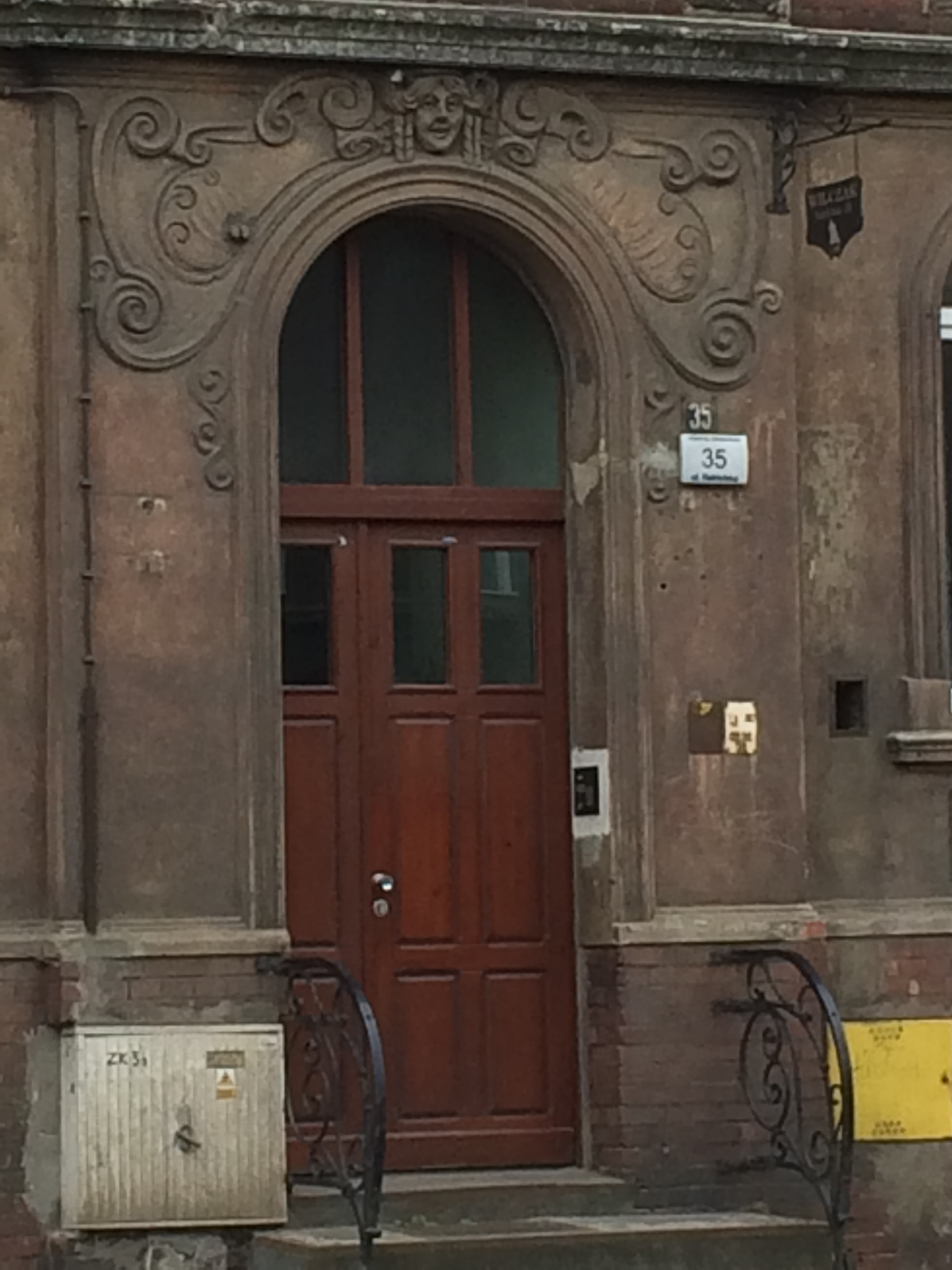
Adorned portal

=== Otto Wirbath's tenement at 39, corner with Chłopickiego street ===
1893, 1906–1907

Art Nouveau, Eclecticism

Otto Wirbath, a carpenter had the tenement erected on the place of the old buildings from the 1880s. His family lived there till the outbreak of World War II.

A majority of the original decoration has disappeared. A 1914 picture portrays the rich details the corner house had. Today, one can still note part of the vegetal stucco around the main entrance, and the wrought iron balconies protruding from the corner and looking onto Nakielska street.

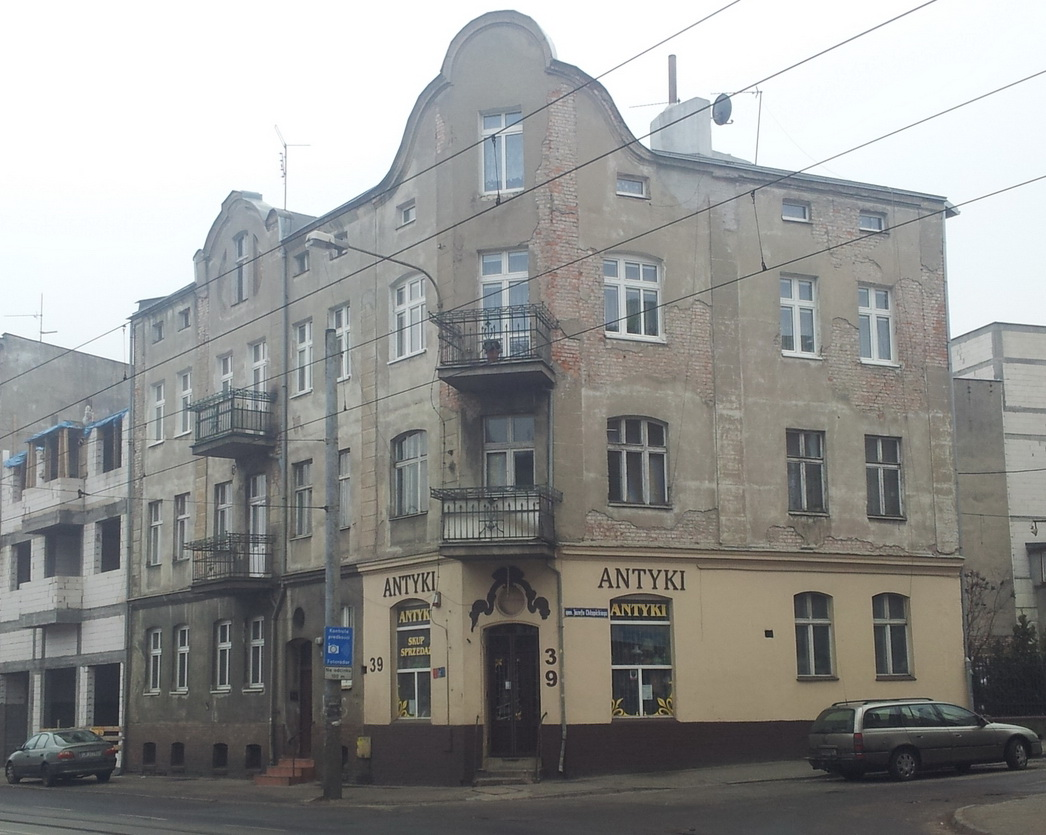
General view from Nakielska street

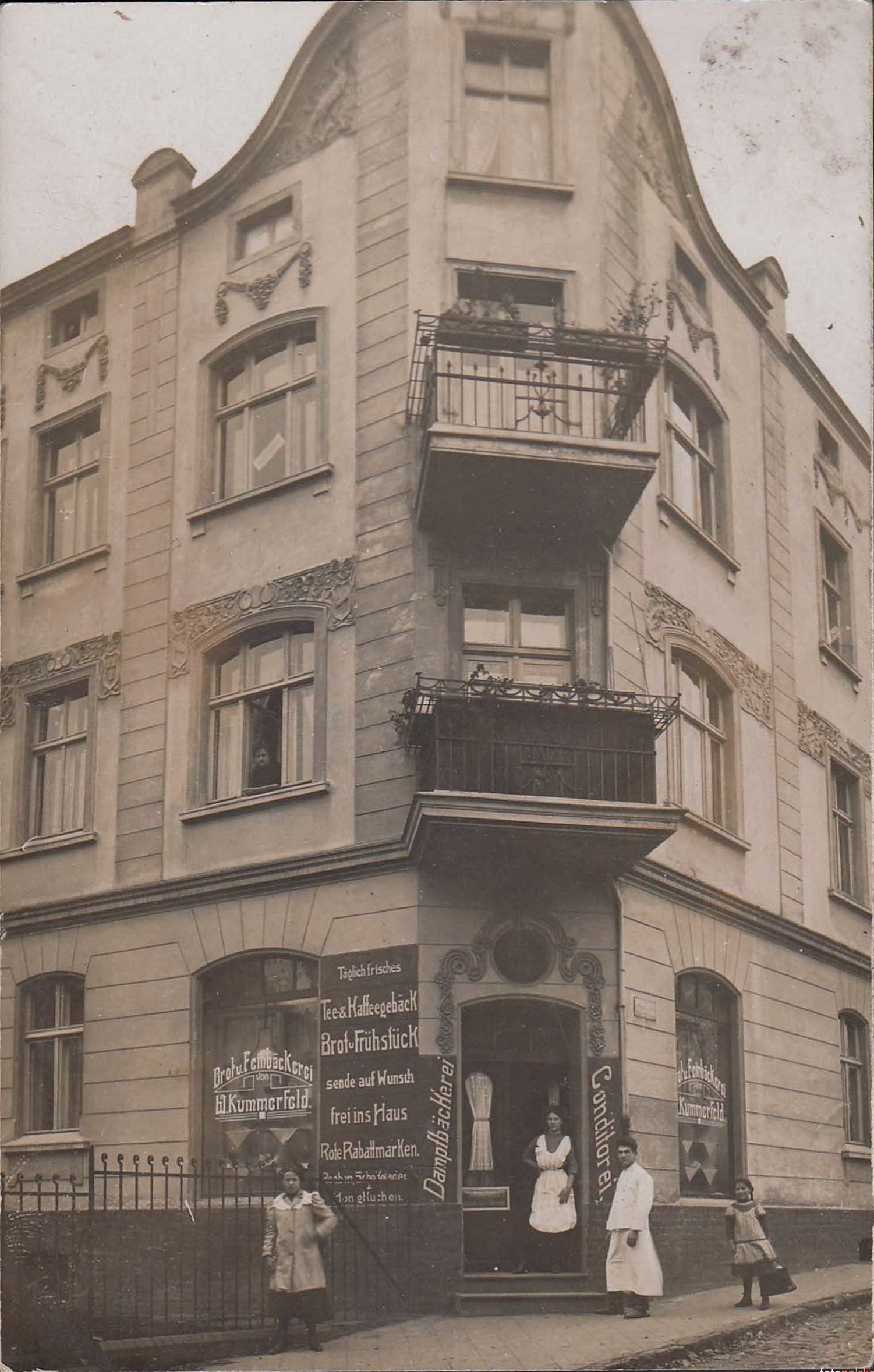
Tenement on a 1914 postcard

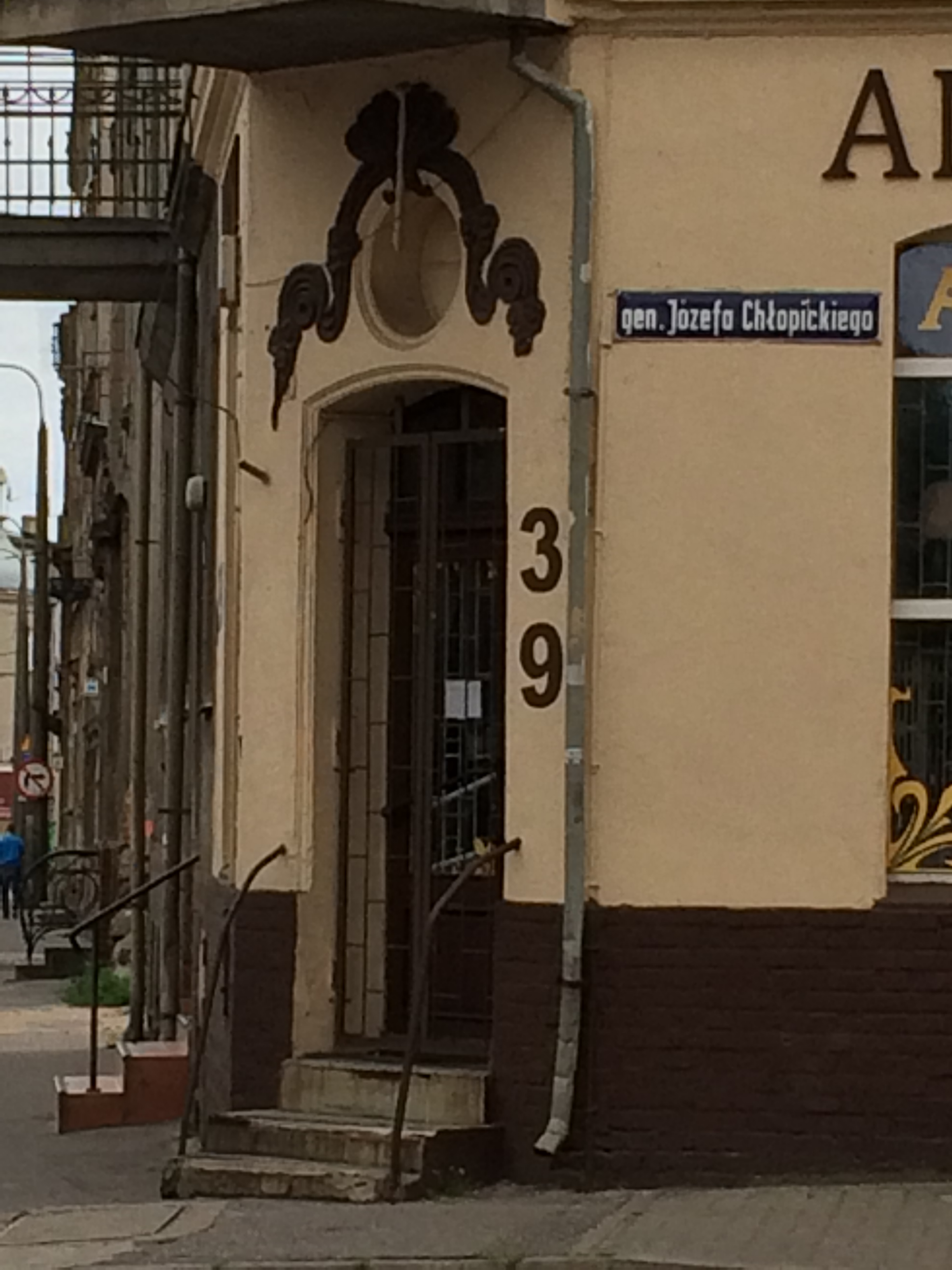
Detail of the portal

=== Franz Staczak's Tenement, at 44 ===
1910–1911

Art Nouveau

The commissioner of this tenement, Franz Staczak, was a construction contractor who had been living at 42 since 1892. The Staszak family owned the building until the start of World War II.

Though time and pollution have affected the main elevation, several art nouveau details remain intact. As for Nr.35, the entrance and the ground floor windows are decorated with festoons and an Art Nouveau-style woman figure. Upper levels display stuccoed pedimented openings and two wrought iron balconies.

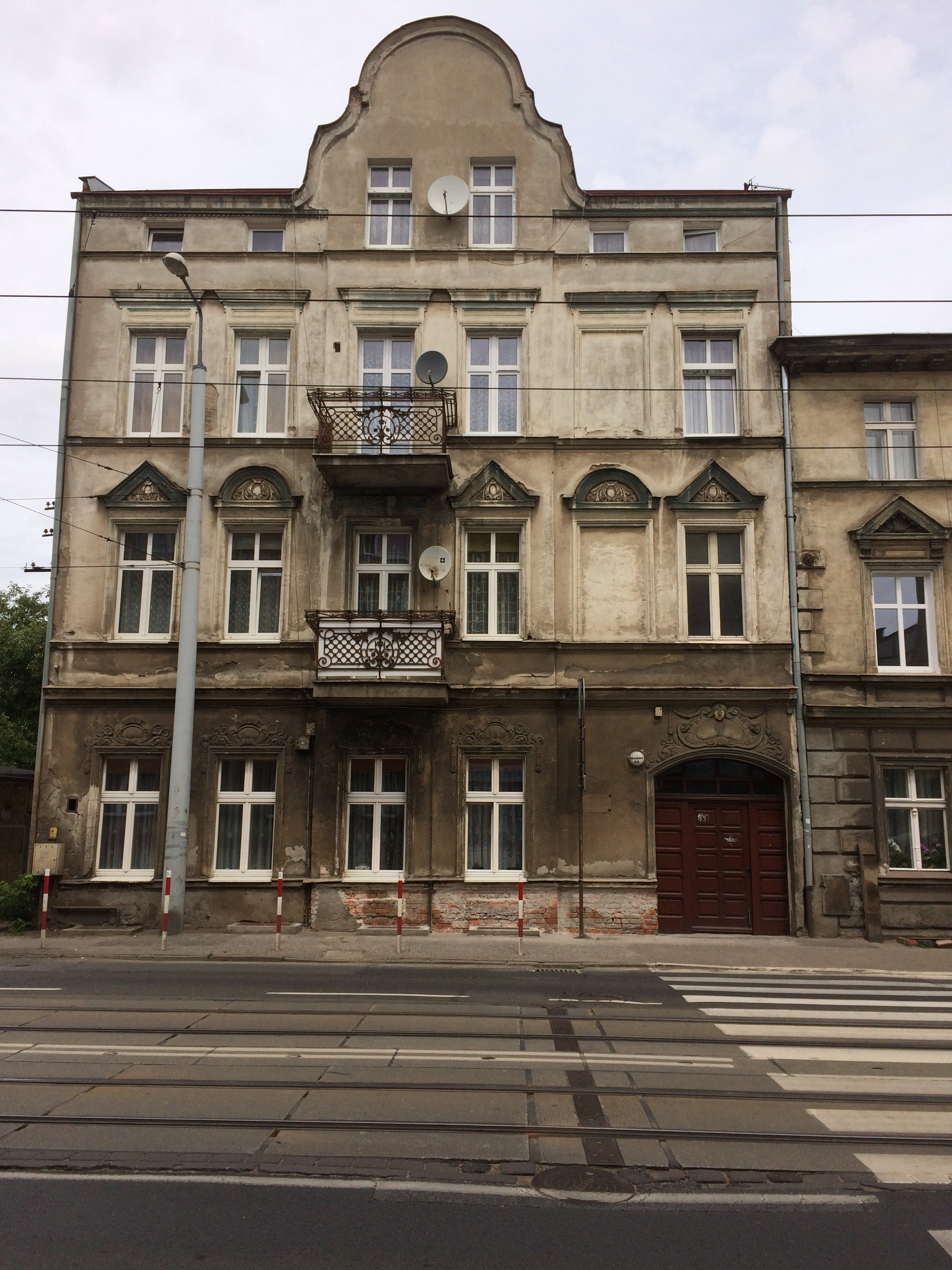
Main elevation from the street

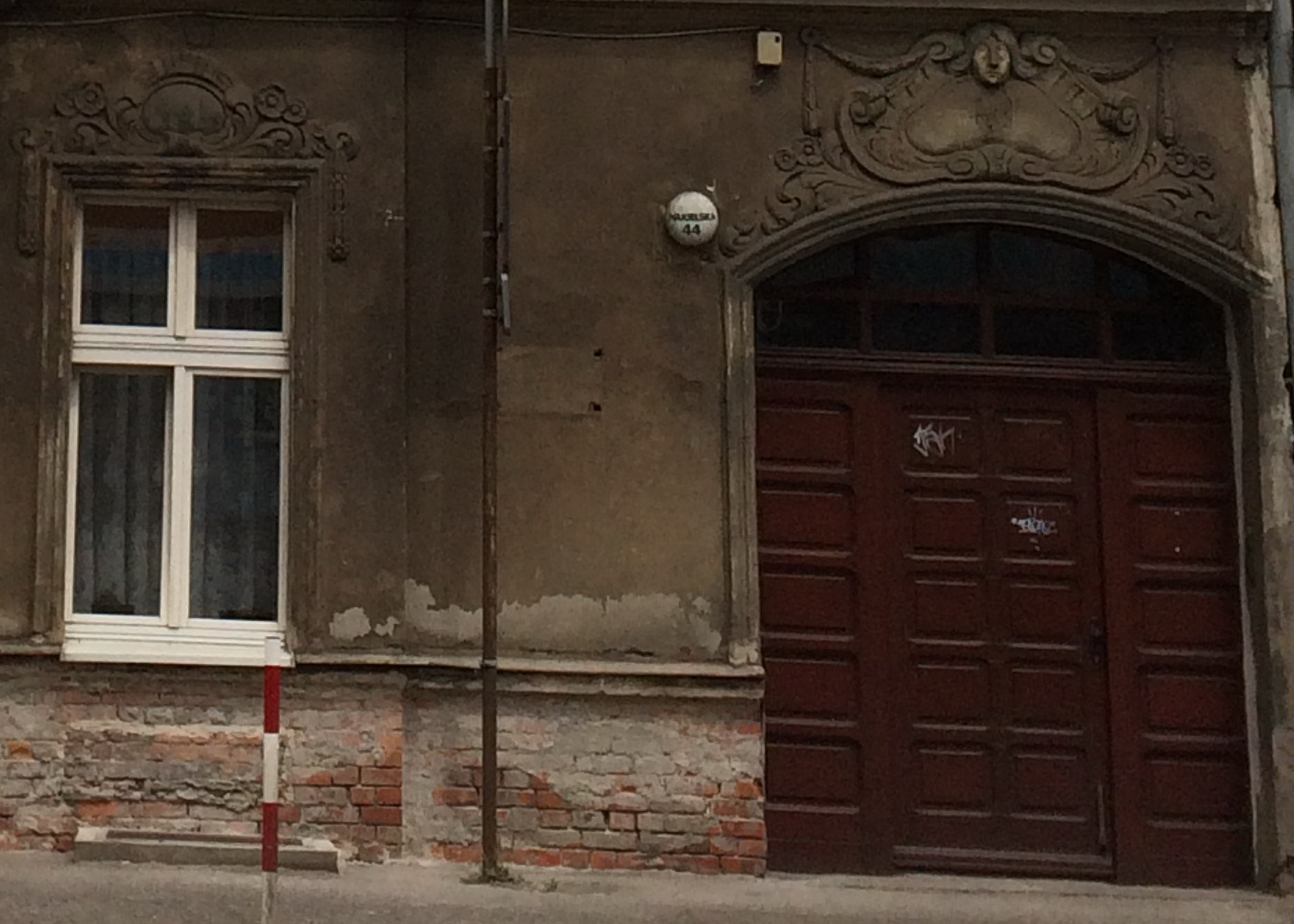
Detail of the portal

=== Blumwe's Kindergarten, at 47 ===
1898, by Fritz Weidner

German Historicism

The villa was initially commissioned by Carl Blumwe as a kindergarten for his factory workers.

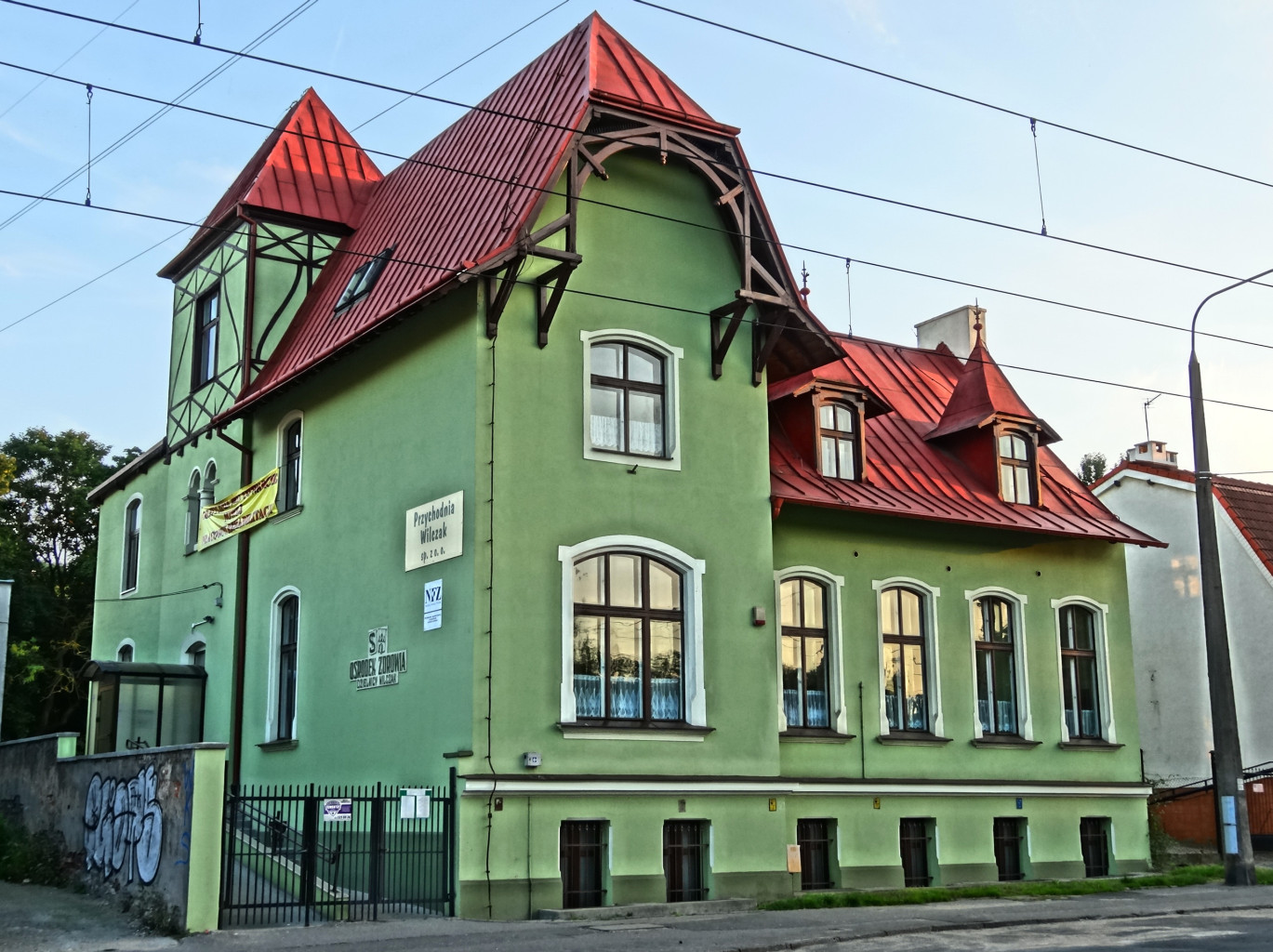
View from Nakielska Street

=== Franz ßfundt's Tenement, at 51 — Corner with Stawowa street ===
1891

Eclecticism

Franz ßfundt was a local chancellor. He ordered the construction of this building in the late 1880s: it is one of the first houses erected on this street; at the time, address was Prinzenthal 38. In the 1920s, the villa housed catholic deacons. Today, it is a property of the Polish Healthcare system (Polish: Narodowy Fundusz Zdrowia): a local dispensary is run there.

The facade presents the type of Neoclassical architecture one could observe in the streets of Bydgoszcz in the second half of the 19th century. The symmetry and the balance is only offset by an additional building on the right of the tenement. First floor window display lintel, topped characteristic small square openings, crowned by a dense corbel table.

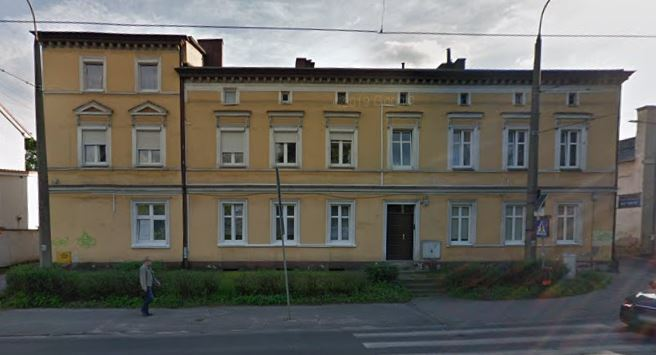
View from Nakielska Street

=== Villa Carl Blumwe, at 53 ===
1850, by Carl Stampehl

Neo-Baroque

The Villa Carla Blumwe is a former industrial building that belonged to factory owners Carl and Wilhelm Blumwe. The building is located at Nakielska street 53 in Bydgoszcz. Its architectural features can be connected with identical industry-related edifices from the second half of the 19th century in Łódź and Warsaw.

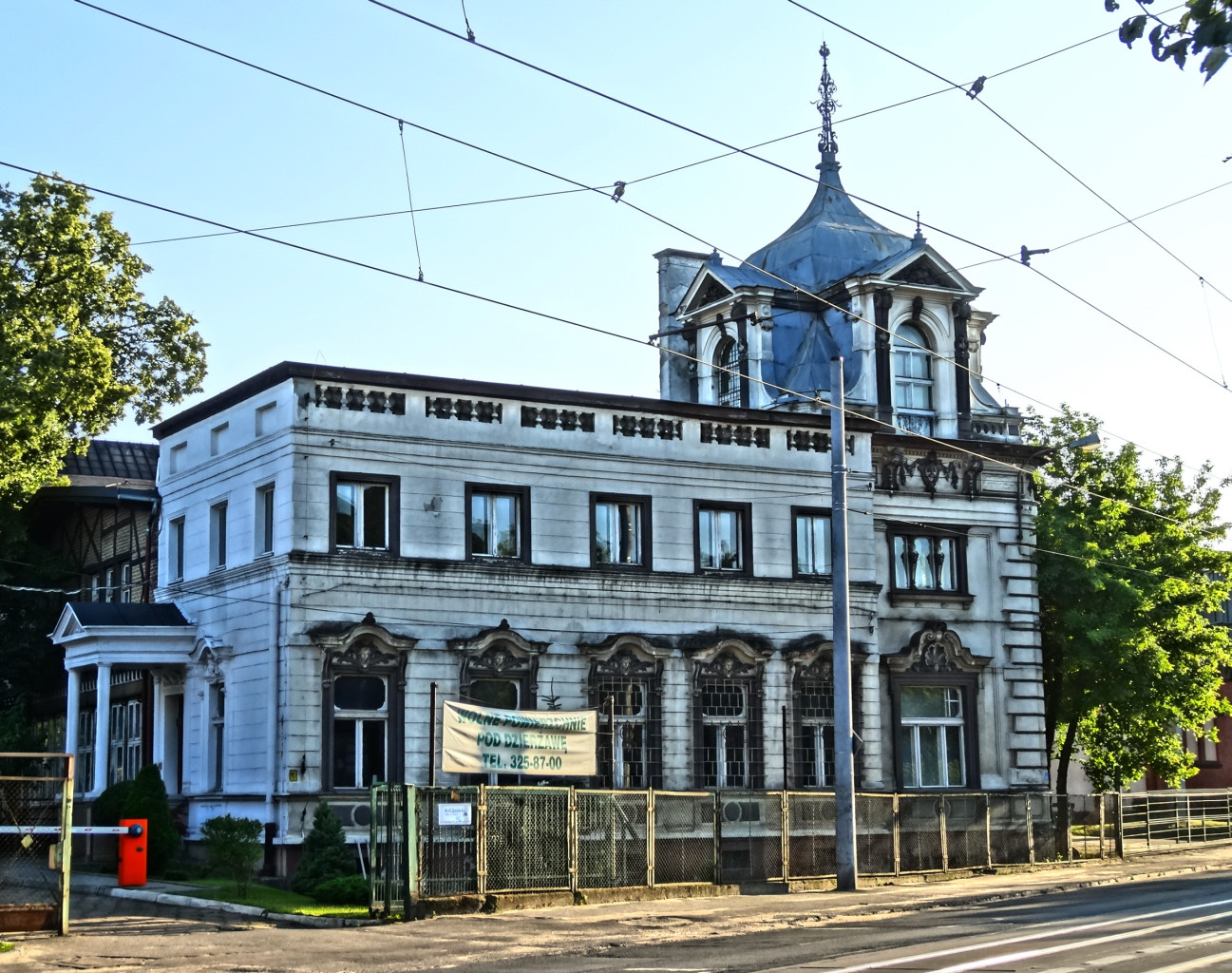
View from Nakielska street

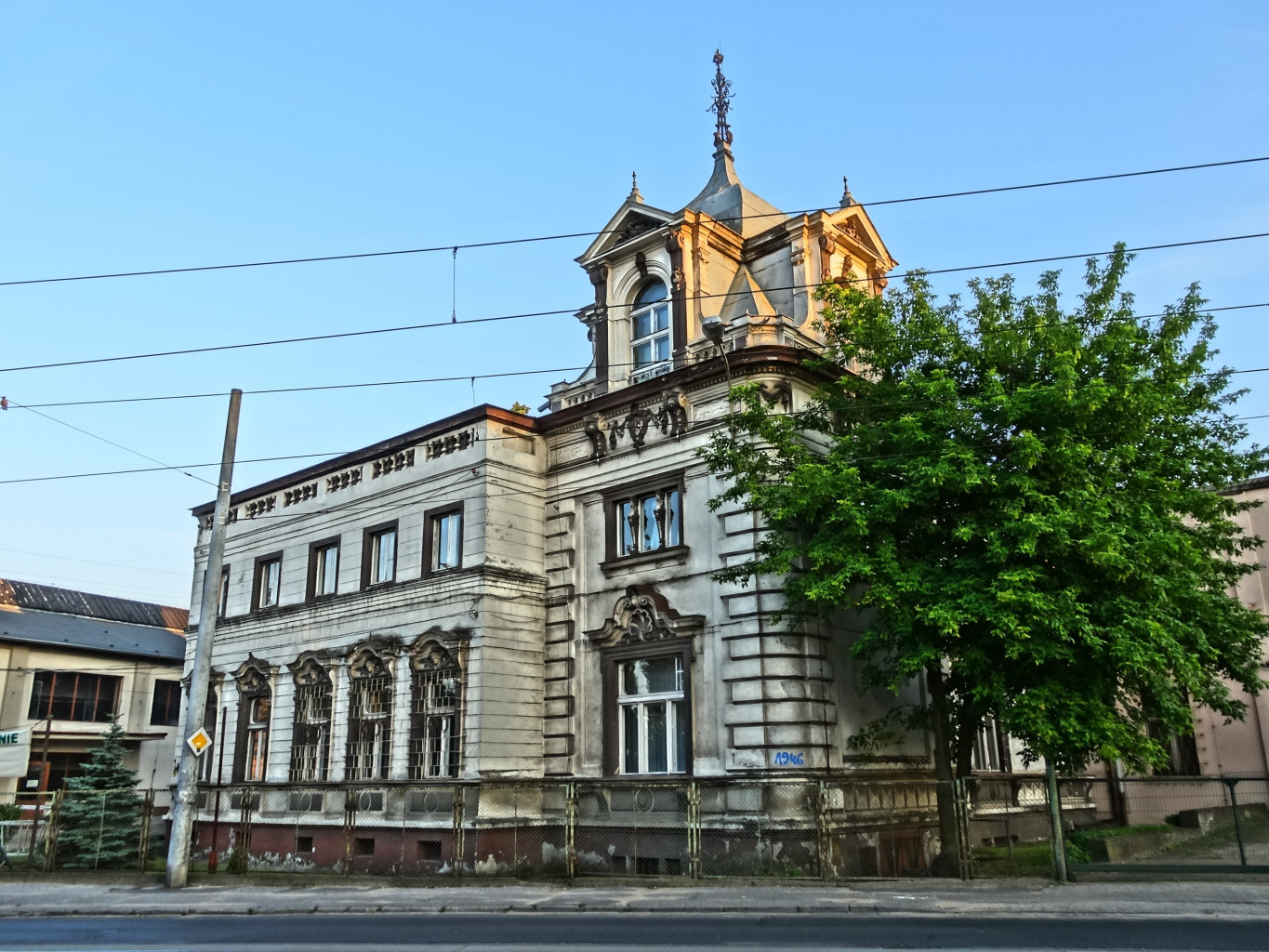
View from Nakielska street

=== Factory of Machine Tools for wood at 55/57 - Corner with Stawowa street ===
1896-1897

Industrial architecture

The factory complex was built in the second half of the 19th century, to the like of well-known industrial similar buildings in Łódź and Warsaw. The factory building is connected to the prestigious residential and office, emphasizing the social status of the manufacturer, while at the same time contrasting with the austere, brick-architecture of the factory halls.

The ensemble, sold out in May 2020, will be partially torn down to give way to a large real estate project.

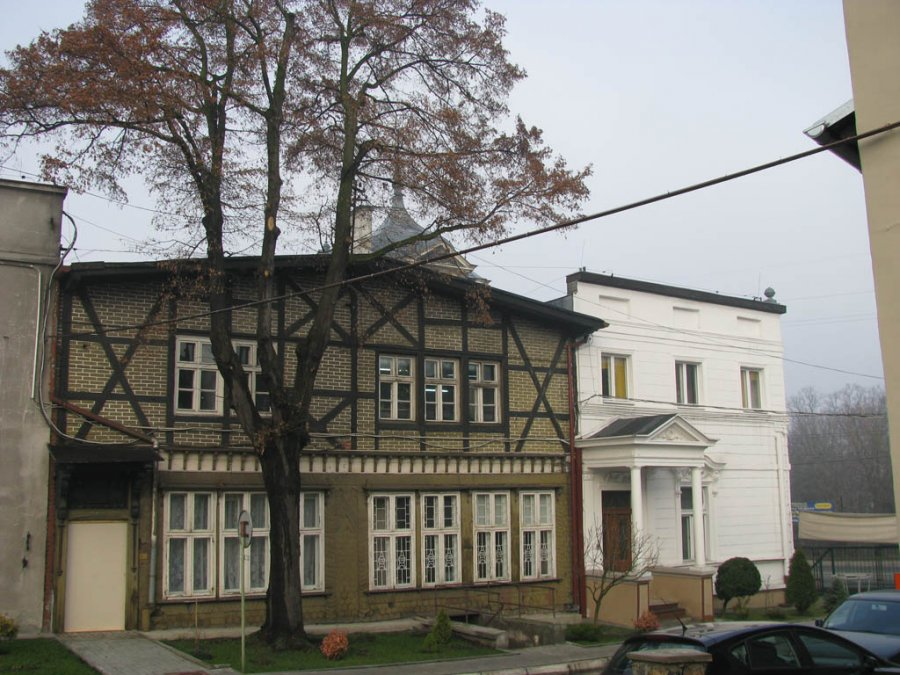
View on the main gate, the lathe ward and part of "Carl Blumwe" Villa

=== Tenement at 58 ===
1911

Art Nouveau

First registered landlord was Johann Erdmann. In the 1910s, the owner of the house was a pastor, Carl Bötticher, in charge of the nearby parish of Wilczak evangelical church, today's Church of Divine Mercy at 68. In 1915, he got retired and moved from Nakelerstarße 66 to Dantzigerstraße 159.

Like many buildings from this architectural hinge period, the facade has elements of nascent Art Nouveau (portal pediment with floral decoration, wrought iron balconies, remnants of top pilaster decoration), but also other eclecticist influences (uniformity of openings and dormers, perception of verticality with a majority of straight-up lines).

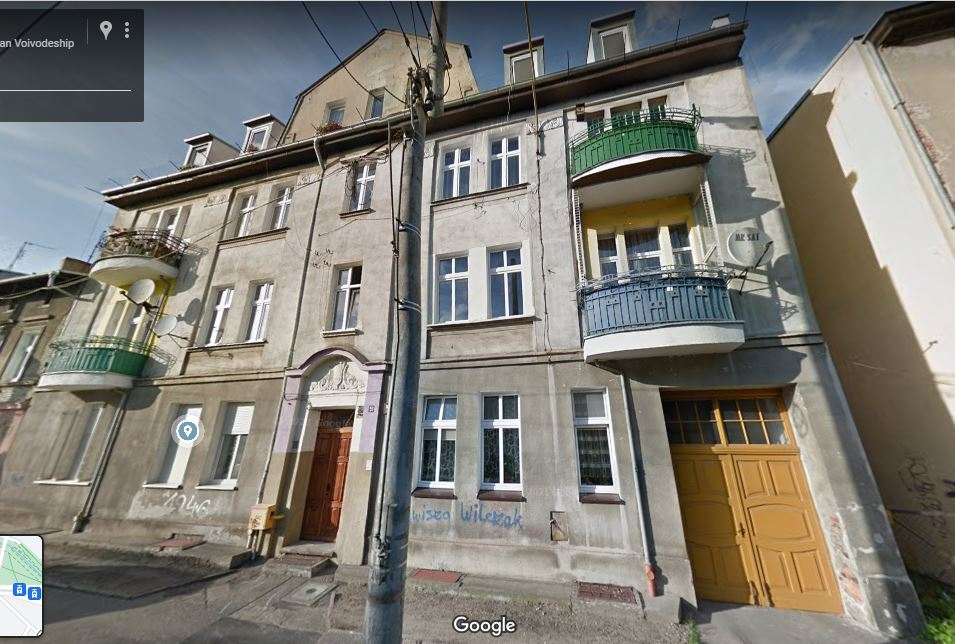
Main frontage on the street

=== Church of Divine Mercy, at 68 ===
Registered on the Kuyavian-Pomeranian heritage list, Nr.601238- Reg. A/841 (10 June 1998)

1905, by Carl Rose

Neo-Gothic

The church is located within the area of Bydgoszcz Canal Park. The construction of the church took place in the context of an intensive development of the evangelical church architecture in Bydgoszcz and its suburbs at the end of the 19th century and early 20th century: in this period, eight Evangelical churches were erected in and around Bydgoszcz, mostly in a red-brick neo-Gothic style.

Initially subordinated to Okole parish authority until 1898, the Wilczak evangelical church was established as independent in 1900, covering Wilczak, Miedzyń and part of Prądy districts. The construction of the temple and ancillary buildings on Nakielska happened in 1902–1904, thanks to the efforts of the first parish priest and the parish council composed of influential people. The main architect was Bydgoszcz designer Carl Rose, who has previously realized in the city:

- a residential house in the backyard of Gdanska St.16 (1882),
- his own house at Gdanska St.51 (1903),
- a tenement at Gdanska St.135 (1893).

The erection of the main structure of the church was completed in 1905, and interiors were finished and equipped in 1906. Evangelical service in the temple was carried out until 1945, although the best years for the development of the parish and the church already ended with the outbreak of World War I. The building was devastated when German community left Bydgoszcz during World War II, and on 2 February 1945, municipal authorities handed out the edifice to responsibility of the parish of the Holy Trinity in Bydgoszcz for Catholic use (dedication occurred on 15 June 1945). Cardinal August Hlond issued a decree establishing on 1 October 1946 the Parish of the Divine Mercy ((in Polish) "Kościół Miłosierdzia Bożego").

The temple has three aisles, its footprint founded on a Christian cross with enclosed chancel oriented to the north. The main body consists of a vast nave, a long-chancel and a short arms transept. Front of the church is dominated by the massive tower topped with a high pointed dome. Temple's facades are decorated with friezes and pinnacles. The front facade has a portal with reliefs depicting Christ the Good Shepherd, and an above mosaic with the image of Our Lady of Czestochowa, the entrance door remained very decorative, with wrought iron hinges and its lock adorned with vegetable motifs. Inside, since the handover for the Catholic liturgy, one can notice:

- an organ;
- a main altar by sculptor Kazimierz Lipinski, with reliefs depicting Jesus of Mercy, Andrew Bobola and Mary Magdalene, set on 7 December 1947;
- two other altars, one dedicated to Our Lady of the Gate of Dawn and the other to Anthony of Padua, both made by Kazimierz Lipinski;
- five confessionals.

The upper galleries above the main entrance date back to the original decor of 1905, others have been removed in 1946..

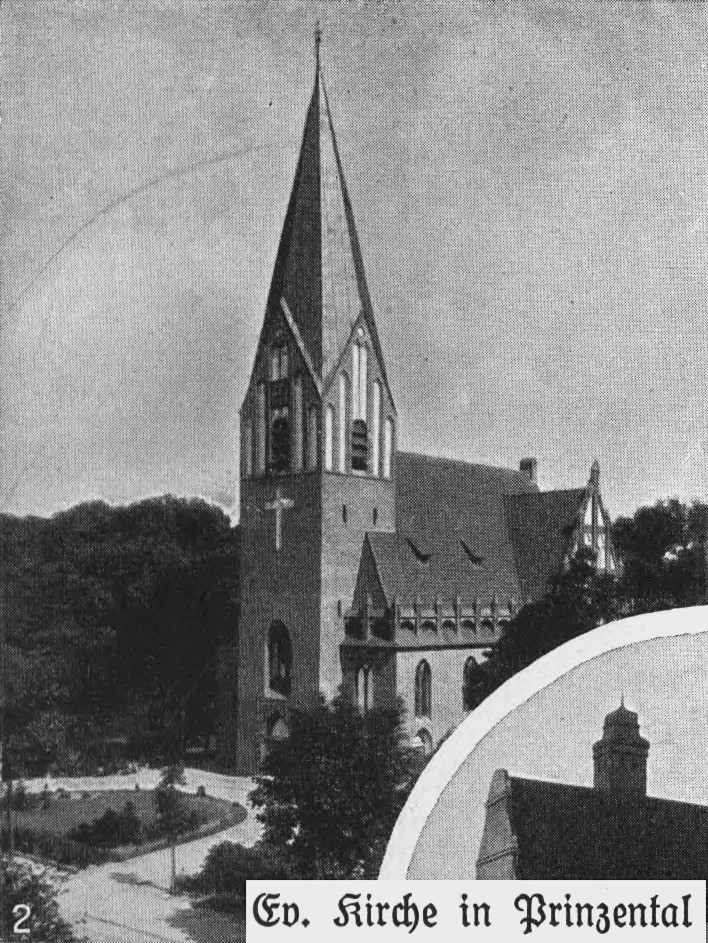
The evangelical temple in 1911

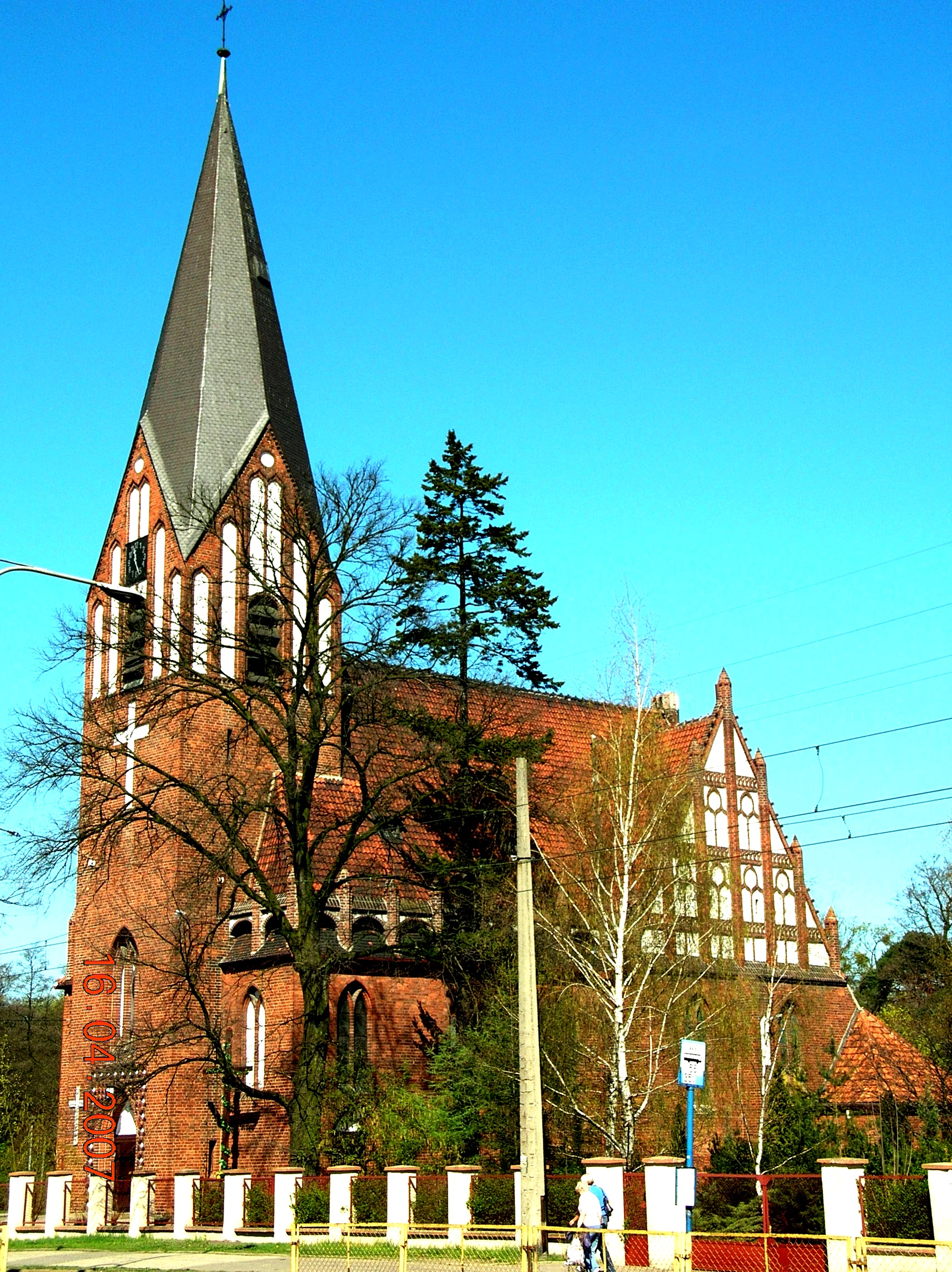
View from Nakielska street

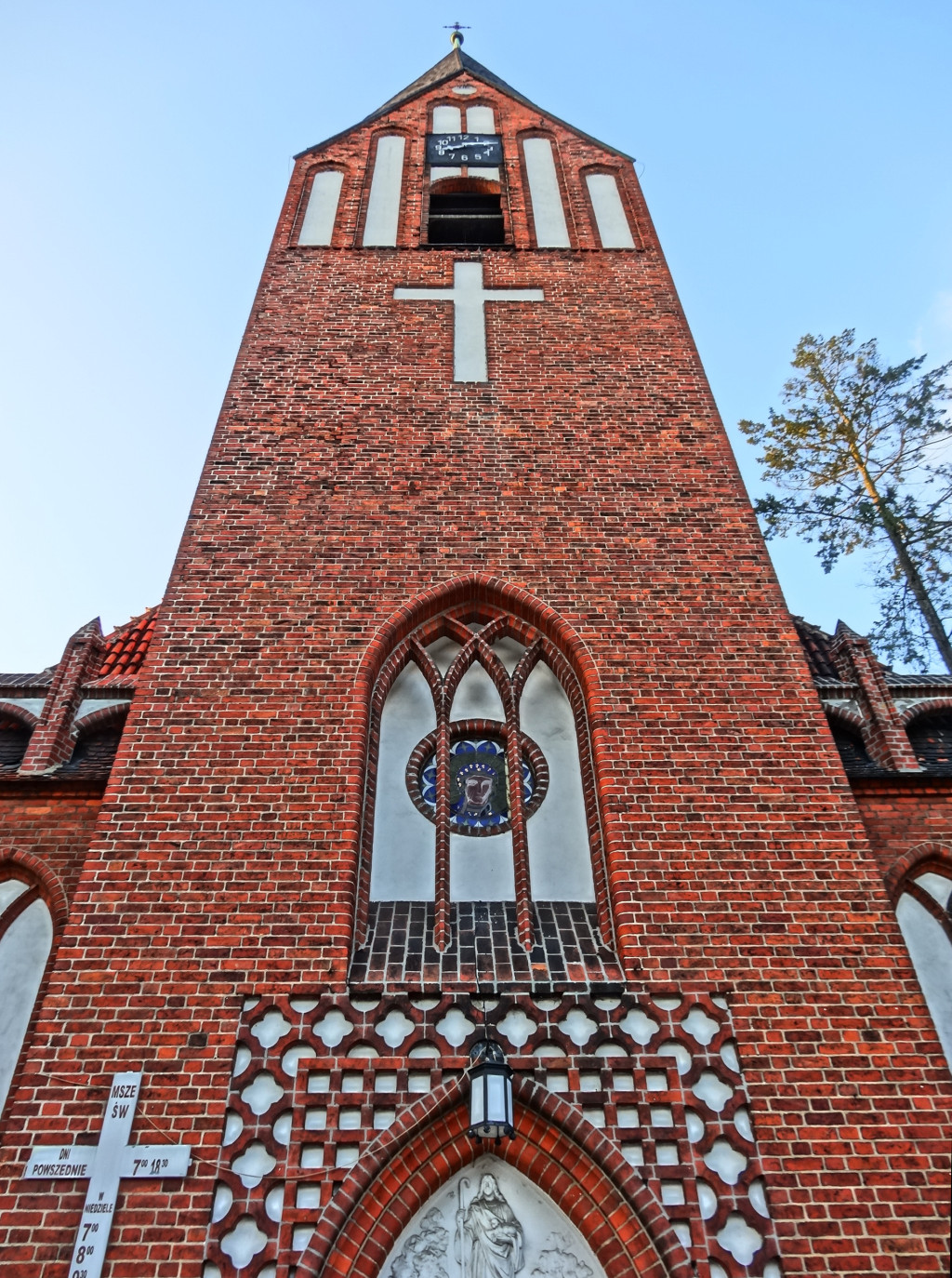
The tower

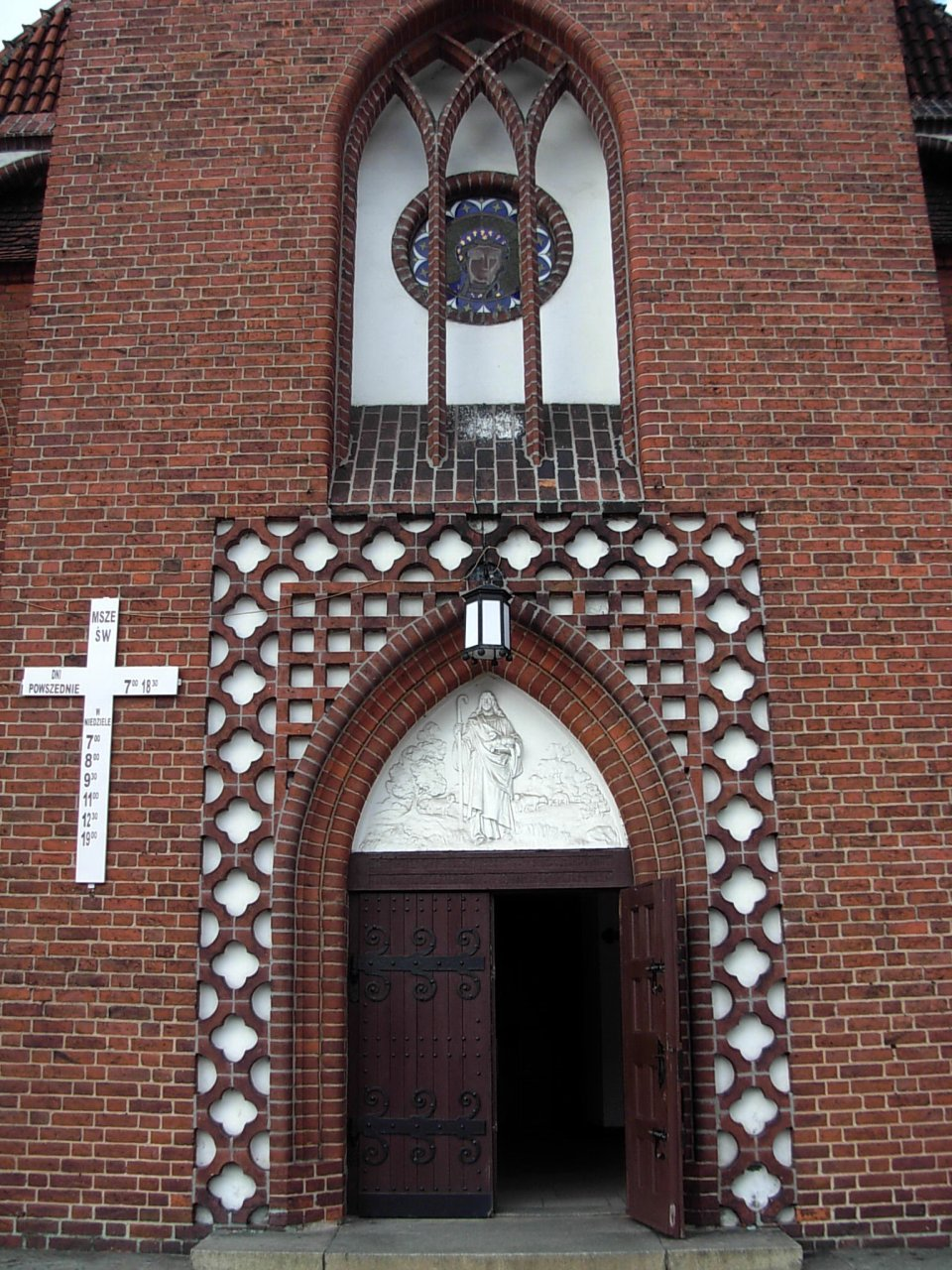
The portal and its mosaic

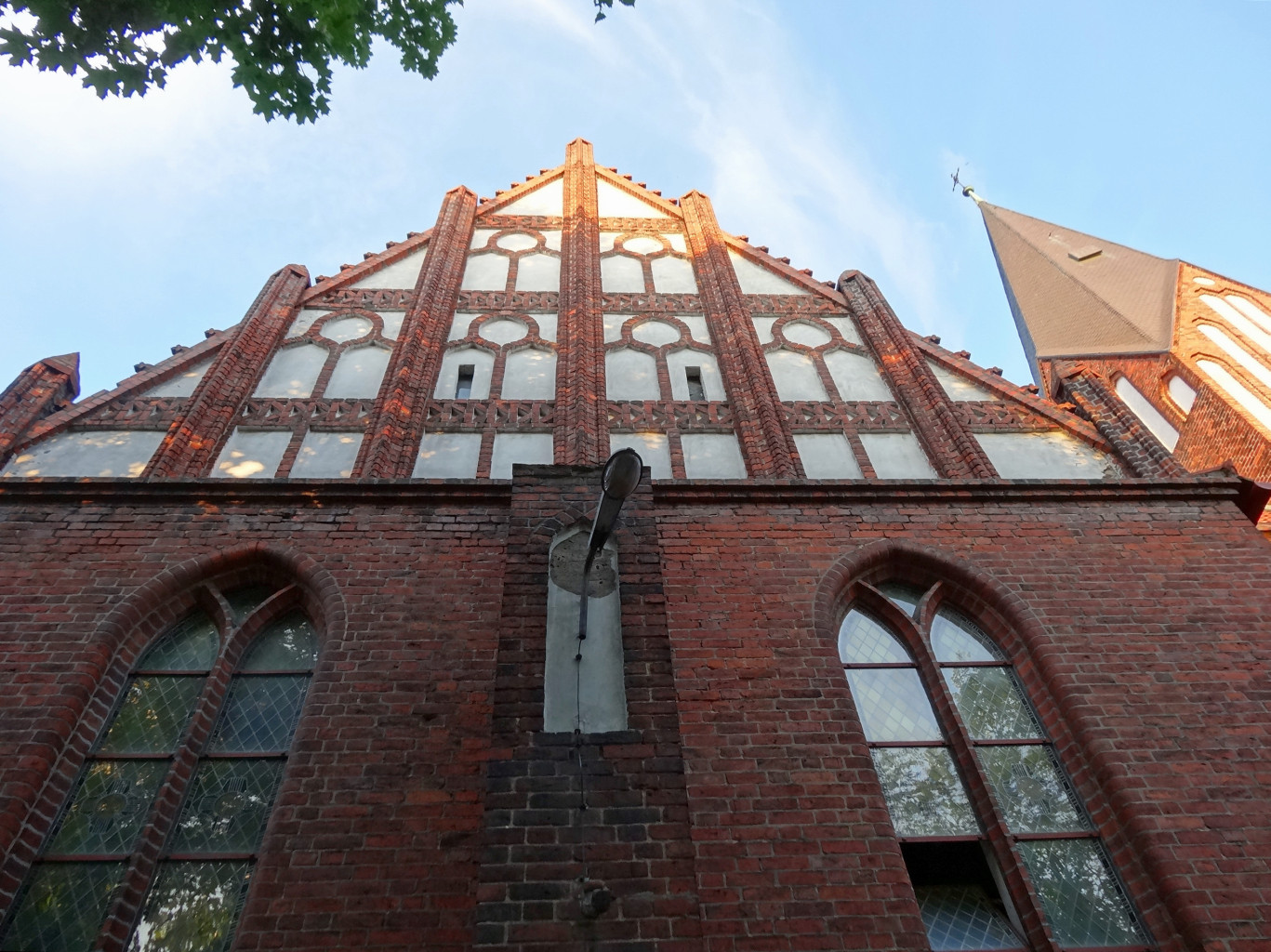
Side frontage

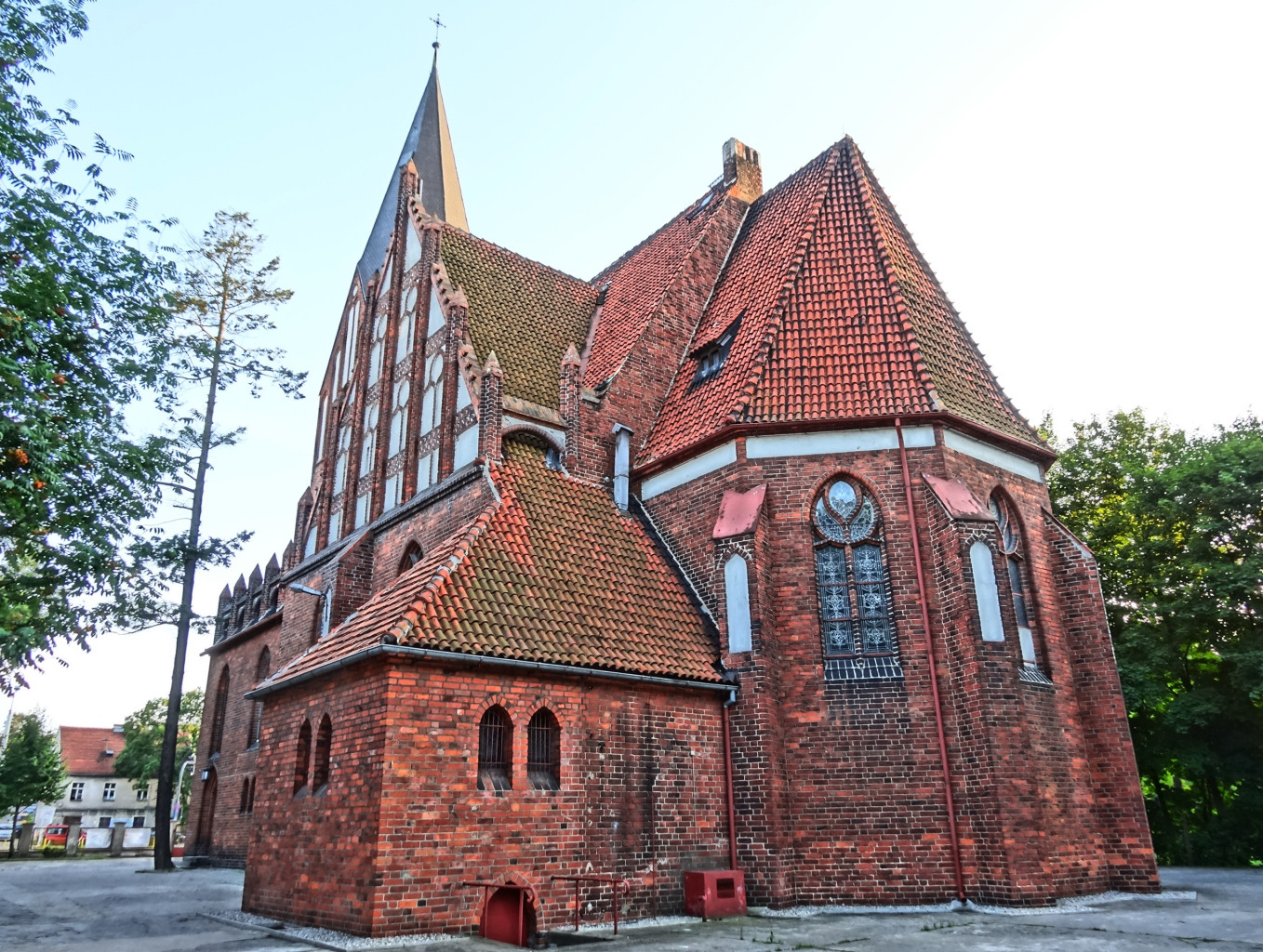
Opposite view

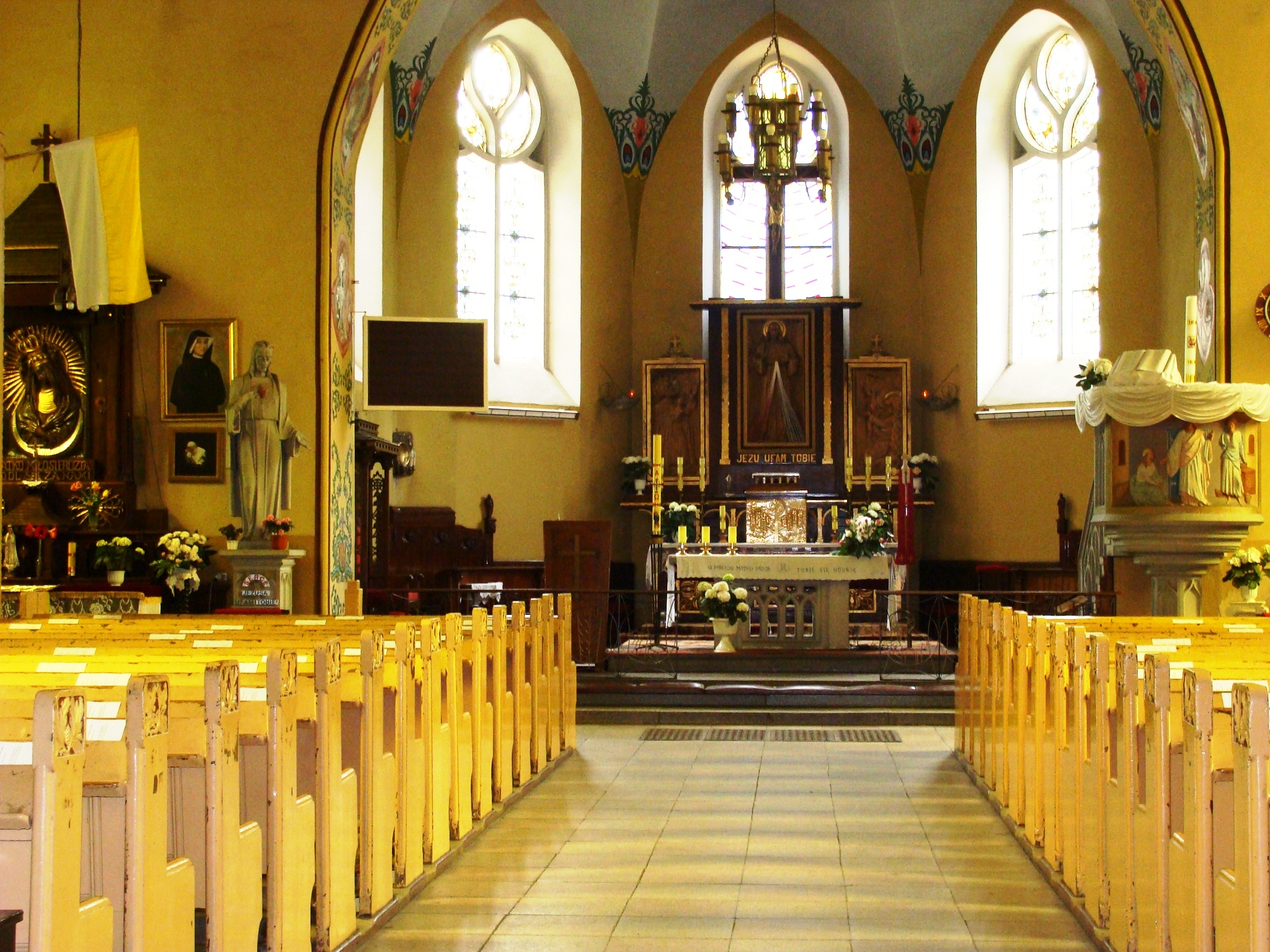
Interior

=== Wilhelm Dettmann's Tenement, at 75 ===
1878, 1906-1907

Eclecticism, elements of Art Nouveau

Wilhelm Dettmann, a tax collector, ordered the erection of the building which address was registered as Prinzenthal 47. His family has lived there till the beginning of the 1920s. Willy Jahr, owner of the bicycle factory at 89, and his wife Hildegard (b. 1904) have been killed in this tenement by Russian soldiers during the liberation of Bydgoszcz.

Though austere at first glance with its cubic shapes, the tenement has many architectural details. An avant-corps topped by a balustrade comprises a couple of loggias, each framed by columns. The main elevation displays stuccoed festoon and pilasters which tops are adorned with floral ornament from Art Nouveau style. A geometric motif frieze runs all the way at the top of the facade.

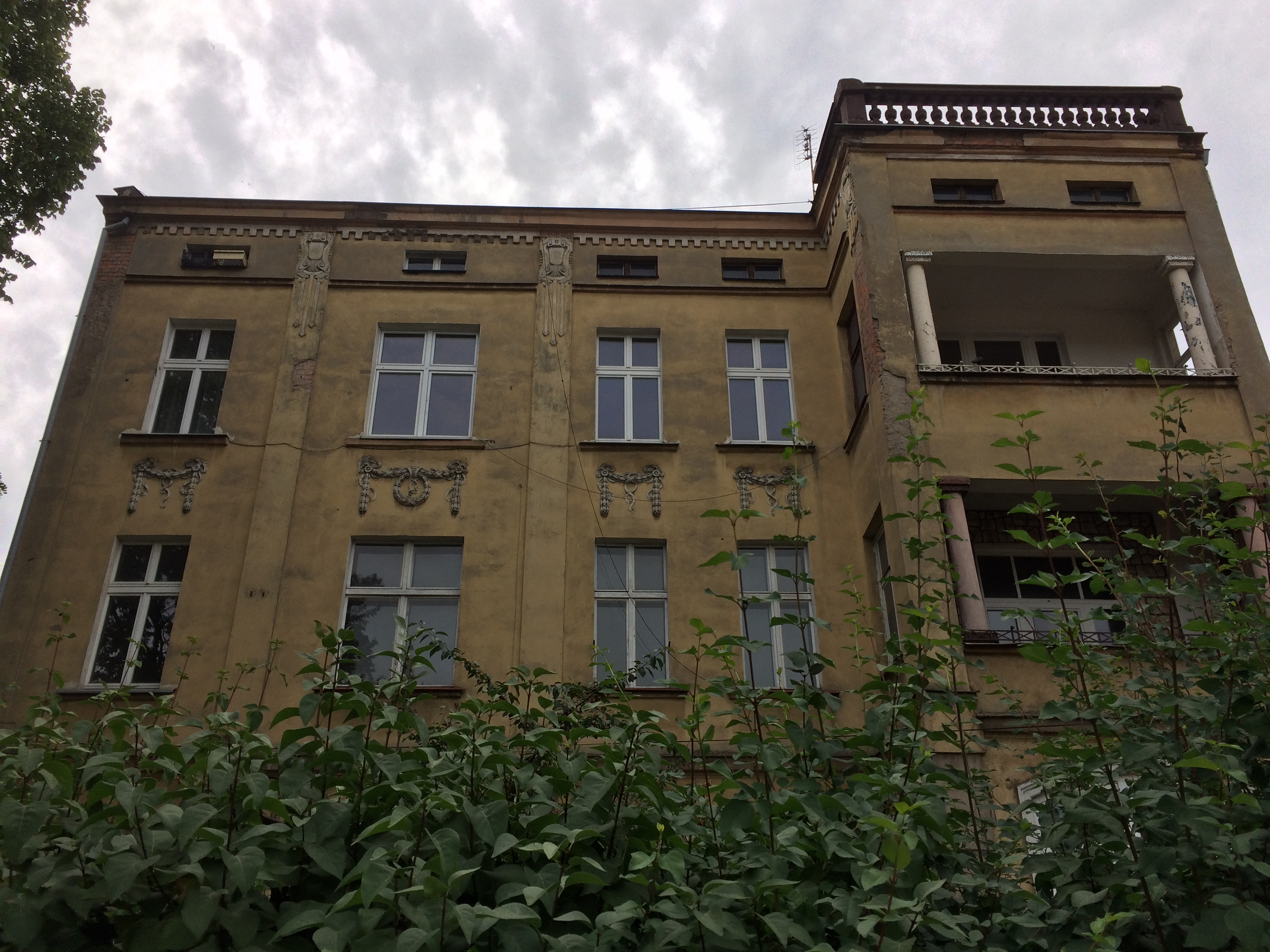
View from the street

=== Tenement at 77 – Corner with Wrzesińska Street ===
1909–1910

Art Nouveau

Although the plot was first constructed in the last quarter of the 19th century, the actual building was a commission of Arnold Reßlaff, then landlord in the start of the 20th century.

The building still preserved its original main door, with geometric motifs and a transom light. The main attraction is the metal covered onion dome ending in spire, that tops the gable at the corner of the tenement. It echoes the same architecture found at Nr.21.

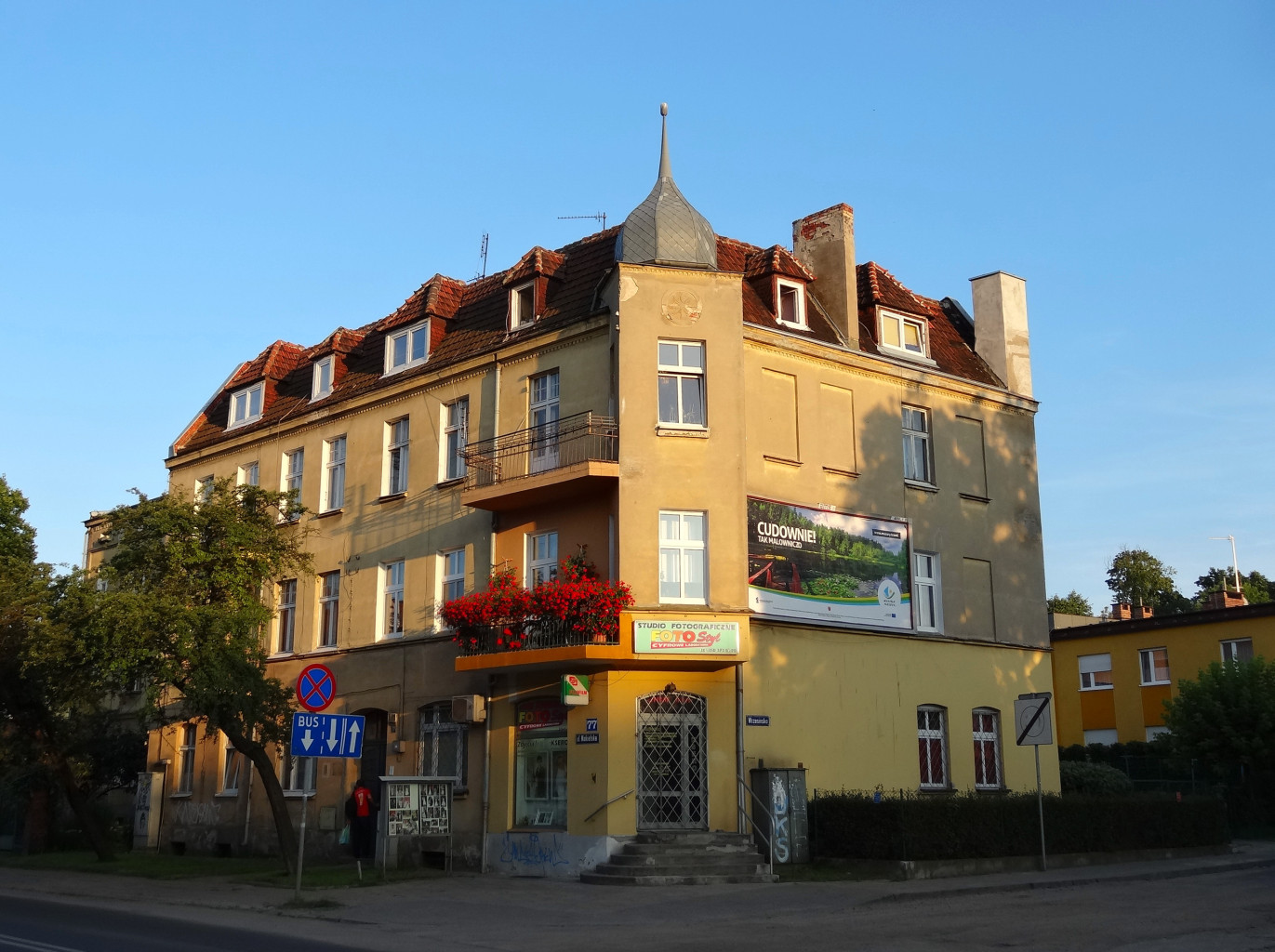
View from Nakielska street

=== Ancient Pomeranian Bike Factory Rekord-Willy Jahr (PFR), at 89 ===
1930–1934, by Alfred Müller

Industrial architecture

After the first World War, Bydgoszcz was considered as the cradle of the bicycle industry in Poland. There were several factories producing bicycles and bicycle accessories. P.F.R. (Polish: Pomorska Fabryka Rowerów)-Willy Jahr stemmed from the small shop launched at the beginning of the 20th century by his Willy 's parents Ernst and Klara Jahr in Dworcowa Street. Willy Jahr took over in 1926 and converted it to a bike assembly plant. Willy Jahr was born in 1891 in Nakło nad Notecią. In the 1930s, with a growing development of domestic manufacturing in the bicycle industry, Willy Jahr's factory took off and in 1930 he established the name P.F.R. for Pomeranian Factory Bike company which in 1931 was transformed into in a limited liability company. At its heyday in 1938, the factory had 100 workers and produced 18700 bikes. A year later, numbers dwindled and operations stopped in 1944. Willy and his wife Hildegard (b. 1904) were killed by Russian soldiers in their bed during the liberation of Bydgoszcz in their apartment at Nakielska 75. His company was then merged with the national bicycle producing firm Romet.

The building, designed by architect Alfred Müller, presents typical functionalist style: it survived mainly preserved till today.

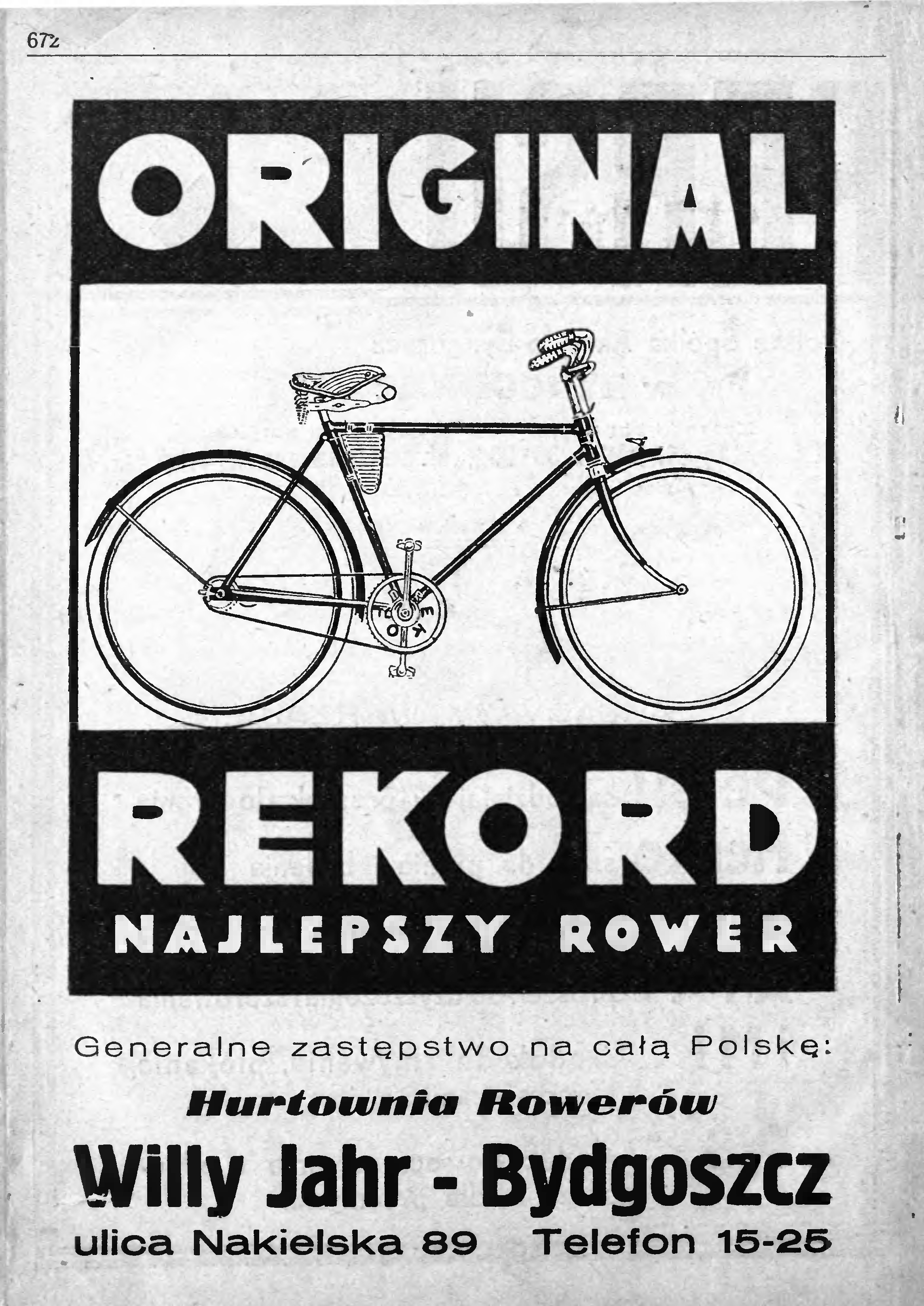
Advert. for Bike Firm at Nakielska 89, c. 1936

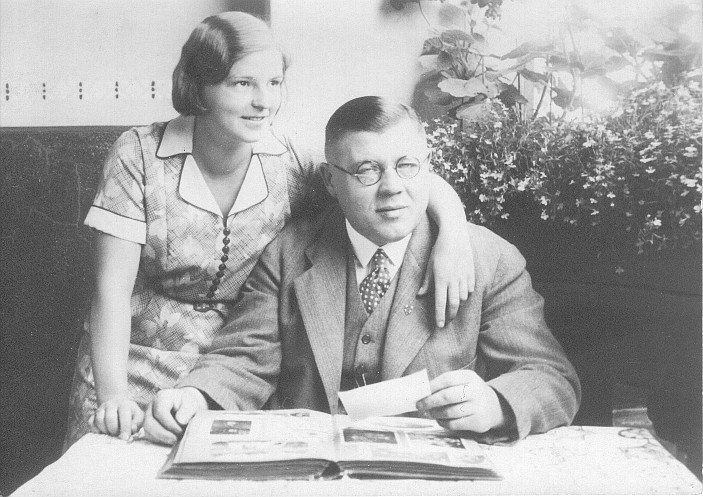
Hildegard and Willy Jahr

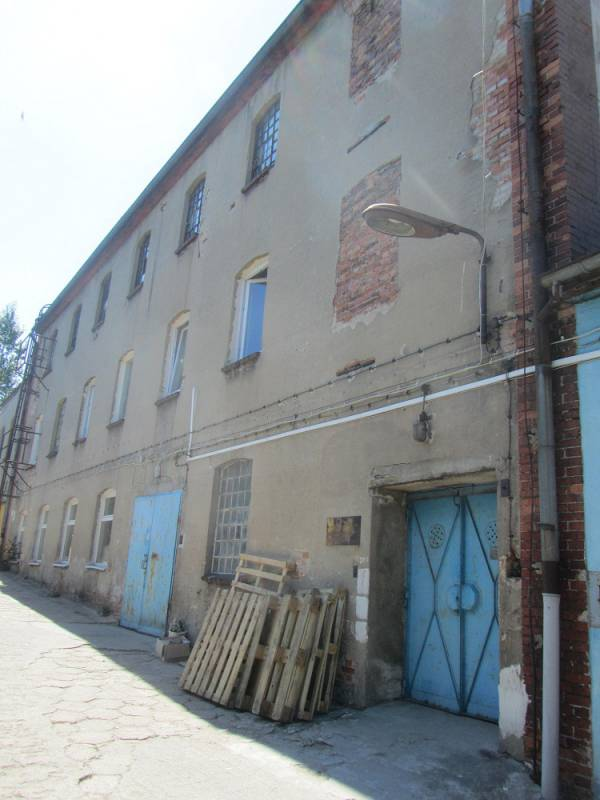
PFR Workshop today

=== Factory of Machine Tools for wood at 129/131 – Corner with Słoneczna street ===
1888

Industrial architecture

These buildings were part of Blumwes' factory complex at the end of the 19th century.

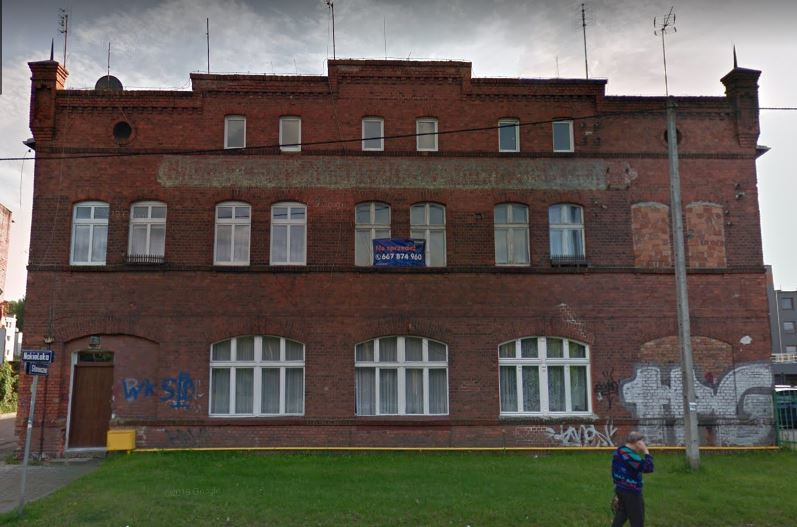
View from the street

== Bibliography ==
- (in Polish) Brzozowska Iwona, Derkowska-Kostkowska Bogna (1997). Fabryka Carla i Wilhelma Blumwe na bydgoskim Wilczaku. Materiały do dziejów kultury i sztuki Bydgoszczy i regionu, z. 2. Bydgoszcz: Pracownia Dokumentacji i Popularyzacji Zabytków Wojewódzkiego Ośrodka Kultury w Bydgoszczy. pp. 71–82.
- (in Polish) Czajkowski, Edmund (1987). Na marginesie pewnej informacji. Kalendarz Bydgoski. Bydgoszcz: Towarzystwo Miłośników Miasta Bydgoszczy. pp. 39–41.
- (in Polish) Badtke, Marek (2006). Kanał Bydgoski. Kalendarz Bydgoski. Bydgoszcz: Towarzystwo Miłośników Miasta Bydgoszczy.
- (in Polish) Praca zbiorowa (1996). Bydgoska Gospodarka Komunalna. Bydgoszcz. ISBN 8385860371.
- (in Polish) Kaja Renata, Kuczma Rajmund (1995). Zieleń w dawnej Bydgoszczy. Bydgoszcz: Instytut Wydawniczy "Świadectwo". ISBN 8385860320.
- (in Polish) Kaja Renata, Kuczma Rajmund (1995). Zieleń w dawnej Bydgoszczy. Bydgoszcz: Instytut Wydawniczy "Świadectwo". ISBN 8385860320.
- History of Willy Jahr factory (in Polish)
