= Villa Wilhelm Blumwe =

Villa Wilhelm Blumwe in Bydgoszcz
- Polish: Willa Wilhelma Blumwe w Bydgoszczy
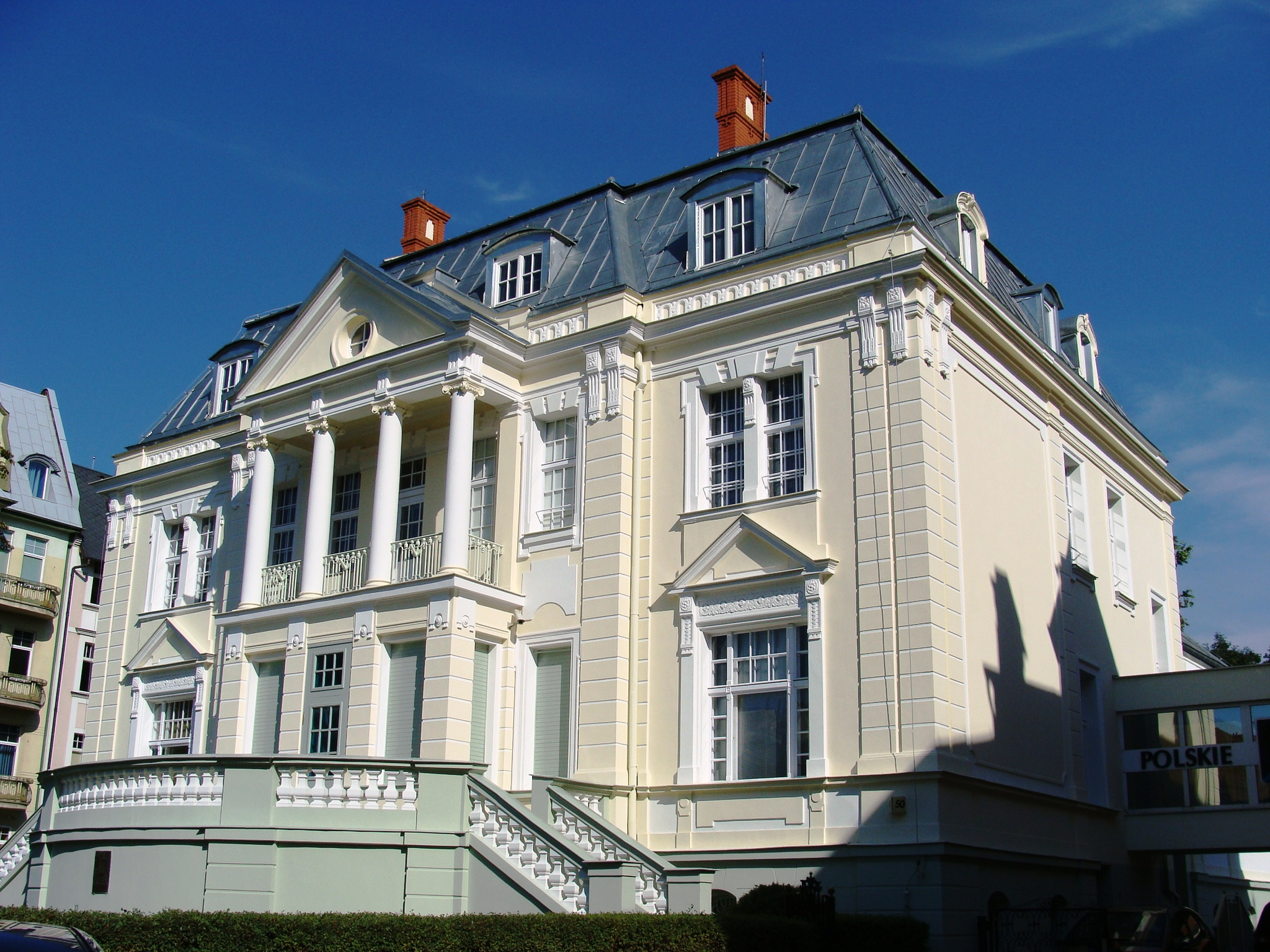
- View from Gdańska Street
- Interactive map of the Villa Wilhelm Blumwe in Bydgoszcz area

General information
- Type: Villa
- Architectural style: Neo-Renaissance
- Classification: Nr.601306-Reg.A/1129, July 8, 1992, and September 29, 1998
- Location: 50 Gdańska Street, Bydgoszcz, Poland, Poland
- Coordinates: 53°7′47″N 18°0′29″E
- Construction started: 1900
- Completed: 1904
- Client: Wilhelm Blumwe
- Owner: Kuyavian-Pomeranian Voivodship Radio

Technical details
- Floor count: 3

Design and construction
- Architect: Hildebrandt

The Villa Wilhelm Blumwe is an historic house in central Bydgoszcz, registered on the Kuyavian-Pomeranian Voivodeship Heritage List.

== Location ==
The building stands on the eastern side of Gdańska Street at Nr.50, near the intersection with Słowackiego Street.

== History ==
The building was erected between 1900 and 1904 by the architect Hildebrandt from Berlin. The investor was Wilhelm Blumwe, son of Carl Blumwe, a wealthy industrialist from Bydgoszcz. Carl Blumwe set up in 1865 a factory producing machines for wood located at 53 Nakielska Street, in Bydgoszcz. Carl Blumwe also had his own villa built nearby his factory in Nakielska Street.

Wilhelm Blumwe, educated in Germany and in England, returned to Bydgoszcz in 1878. He was a partner with his father in the running of the factory for Woodworking Machinery. After his father died in 1887, Wilhelm ran the company itself, developing and modernizing it: in 1897 it became a joint stock company, with representations in Berlin, Magdeburg and Cologne, exporting abroad to China, United States and Africa. His high income (approx. 55-60 thousand marks a year) allowed him to donate for social and charity purposes, as well as funding the construction of his stately villa.

Around the villa, the plan of the garden was designed by engineer J.E. Larassa in February 1901. On top of the front tympanum pediment of the building stood an urn with the ashes of Carl Blumwe, until the occupation of Bydgoszcz by Nazi forces in 1940. The villa belonged to the Blumwe family till 1923, when Maria, Wilhelm's widow, died.

From 1923 to 1933, the owner of the house was Leon Figiel. He slightly altered the interiors.

In 1933, the edifice was taken over by the Polish Club, an intellectual elite club of the city. From the autumn 1939 to the turn of 1940, the building housed the command of German self-defense (German: Selbstschutz Westpreussen). The place also housed Werner Kampe, the Kreisleiter of the local NSDAP. In the basement, numerous executions by shooting of Poles were performed, and the building now has a memorial plaque in honor of the murdered. In September 1940, the villa was occupied by the Nazi county leadership (German: Kreisleitung der NSDAP Westpreussen): it was at that time that the urn with Carl Blumwe's ashes was destroyed from the top of the tympanum. Interiors were rebuilt by dividing space to create offices and meeting rooms for offices, the fence was pulled down and at the front two tall white painted masts were erected.

In 1945, the building was adapted for the needs of Kuyavian-Pomeranian Voivodship Radio PIK, which first broadcast on May 1, 1945. Here worked, among others, Jeremi Przybora. In 1995, the villa was fully renovated: the project supported by Radio PIK received a prize in the competition organized by Polish heritage secretary for the best historic building rehabilitation. The renovation project comprised also the adjacent building "Villa Flora".

Today, a restaurant, Meluzyna, has been opened in the ground floor and basement of the premises, using a side entry that gives onto Słowackiego Street.

== Architecture ==
The building possesses the classical shape of a palace, with a style referring to Palladian architecture, popular in Europe in the late 19th century. Decorative motifs and compositional schemes are borrowed from Andrea Palladio's treaty "I Quattro Libri dell'Architectura" (cf. Andrea Palladio's Villa Capra "La Rotonda" in Vicenza). The villa has a rectangular footprint, consisting of a front part and a lower ground floor storey on the east, with a terrace overlooking the garden. An avant-corps stands on the front street, with a porch up the stairs, topped with a tympanum.

The front entry is preceded by a terrace with mirrored side stairs. The façades are adorned with pilasters, bossage, Ionic capitals, metal and stone railings, terraces, a balcony and windows with triangular pediments. Nowadays, an elevated covered walkway connects the villa with adjacent Villa Heinrich Dietz, also the property of Radio PIK.

From the original interior has been preserved the hall with a glass ceiling, shaped as a patio.

The building and its garden have been put on the Kuyavian-Pomeranian Voivodeship Heritage List, Nr.601306 Reg.A/1129, on July 8, 1992, and September 29, 1998.

== Gallery ==
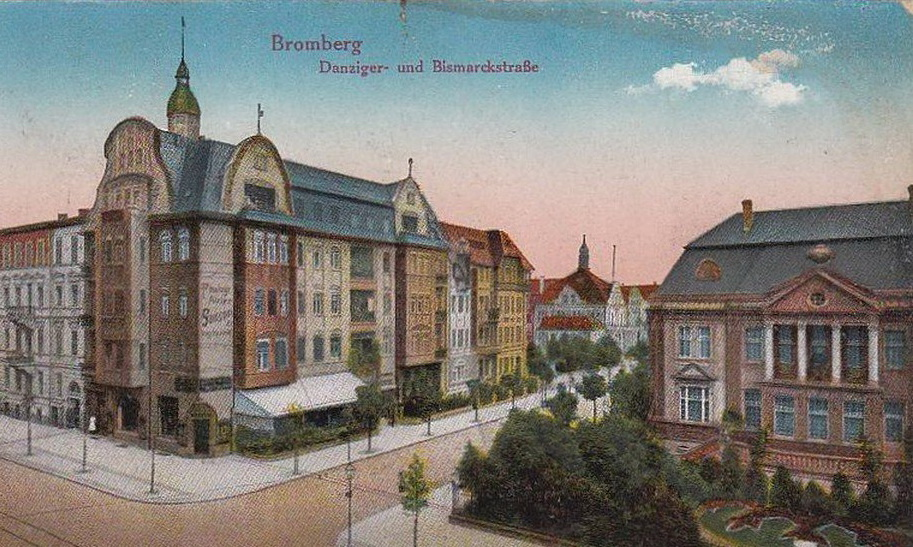
Villa Wilhelm Blumwe 1907 - NB the urn containing ashes then standing on top of the front façade

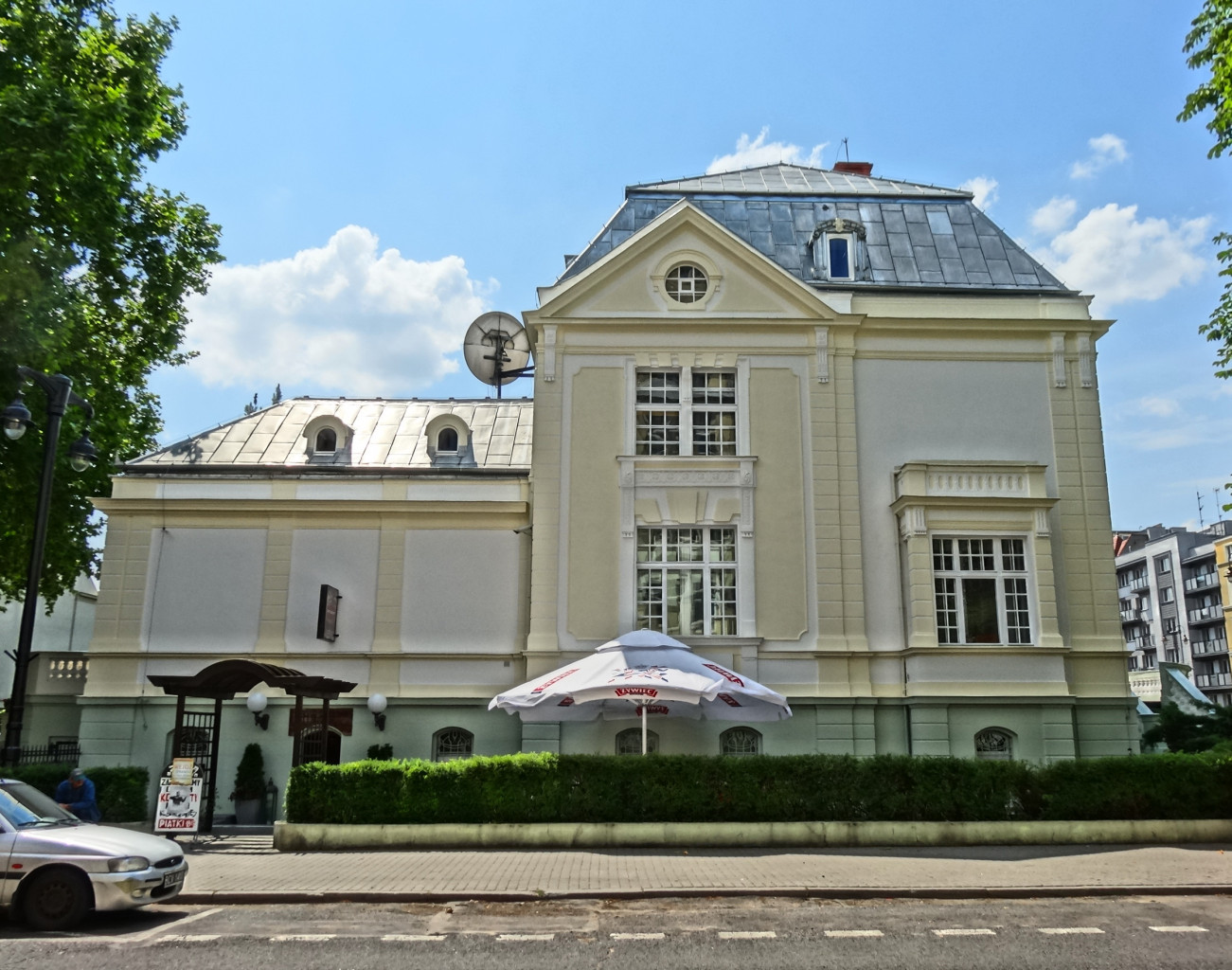
View from Słowacki Street

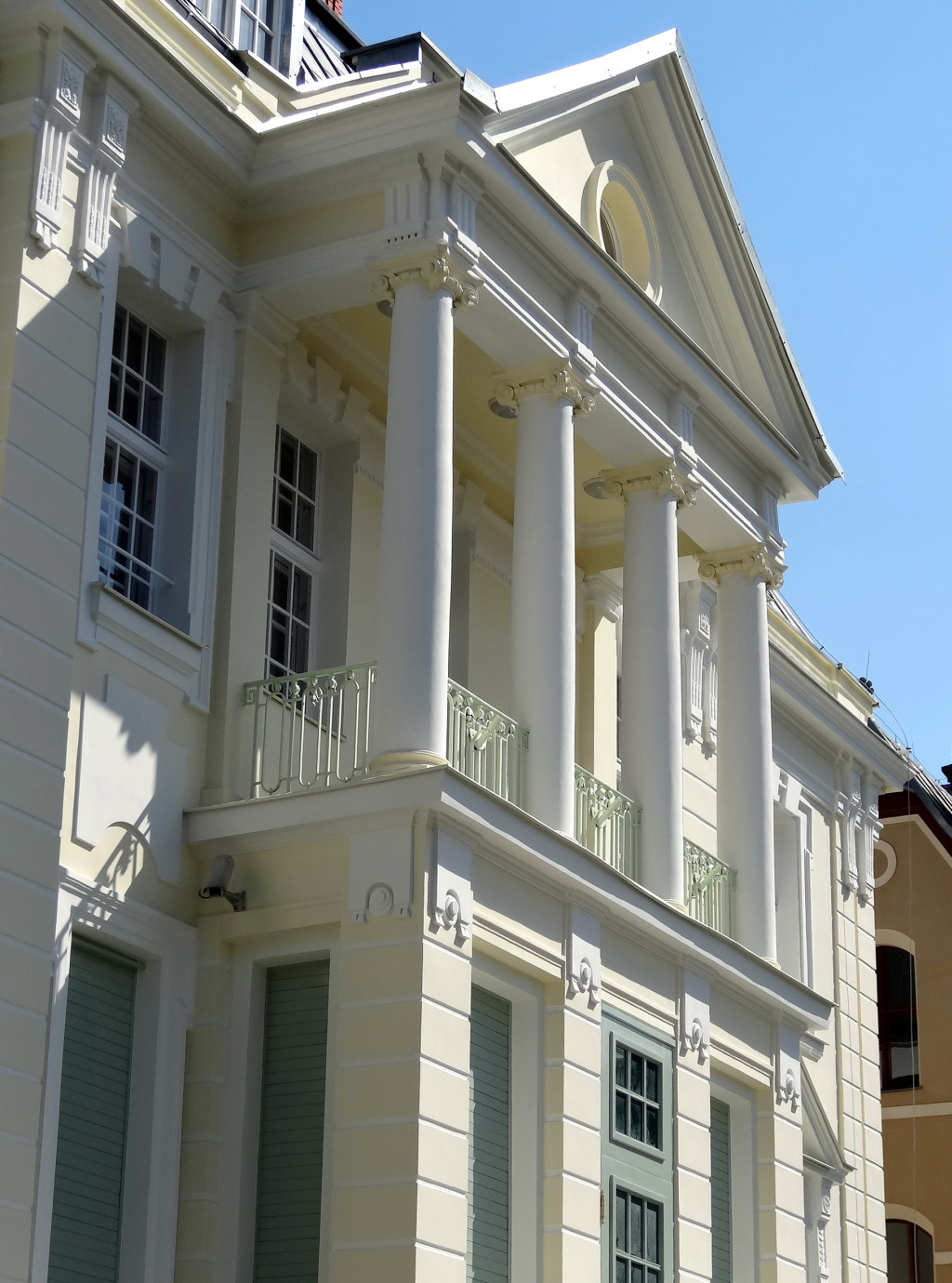
Colonnade

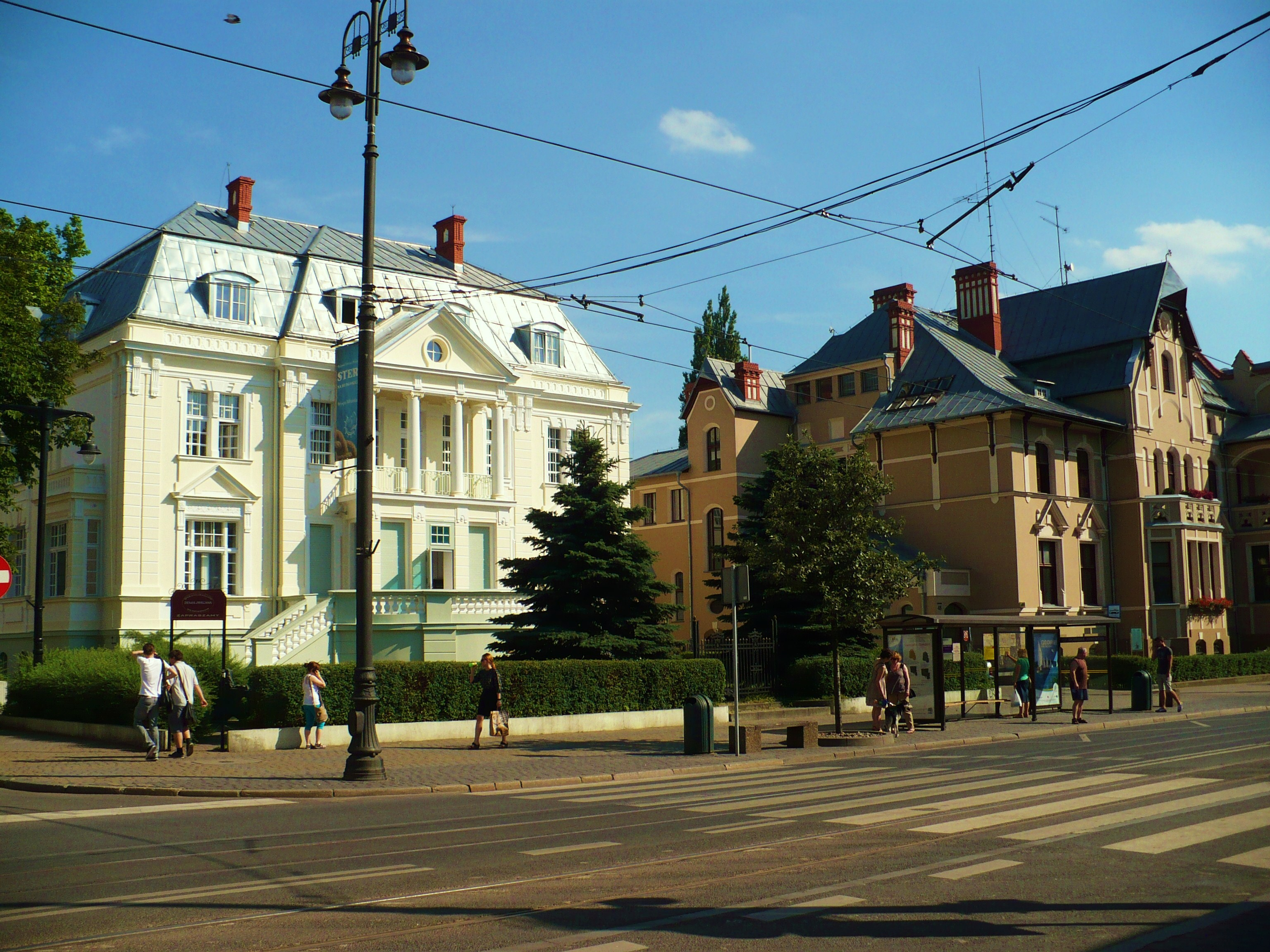
Villa Wilhelm Blumwe and Villa Heinrich Dietz

== See also ==
- Bydgoszcz
- Villa Heinrich Dietz in Bydgoszcz
- Gdanska Street in Bydgoszcz
- Blumwes' buildings in Bydgoszcz
- (in Polish) Downtown district in Bydgoszcz

== Bibliography ==
- (in Polish) Bręczewska-Kulesza Daria, Derkowska-Kostkowska Bogna, Wysocka A. (2003). Ulica Gdańska. Przewodnik historyczny. Bydgoszcz: Wojewódzki Ośrodek Kultury w Bydgoszczy. ISBN 9788386970100.
- (in Polish) Czajkowski, Edmund (1987). Na marginesie pewnej informacji. Kalendarz Bydgoski. Bydgoszcz: Towarzystwo Miłośników Miasta Bydgoszczy. pp. 39–41.
- (in Polish) Parucka, Krystyna (2008). Zabytki Bydgoszczy: minikatalog. Bydgoszcz: TIFEN" Krystyna Parucka. ISBN 9788392719106.
- (in Polish) Wysocka, Agnieszka (1997). Willa Blumwego. Materiały do dziejów kultury i sztuki Bydgoszczy i regionu, z. 2. Bydgoszcz: Pracownia Dokumentacji i Popularyzacji Zabytków Wojewódzkiego Ośrodka Kultury w Bydgoszczy. pp. 67–70.
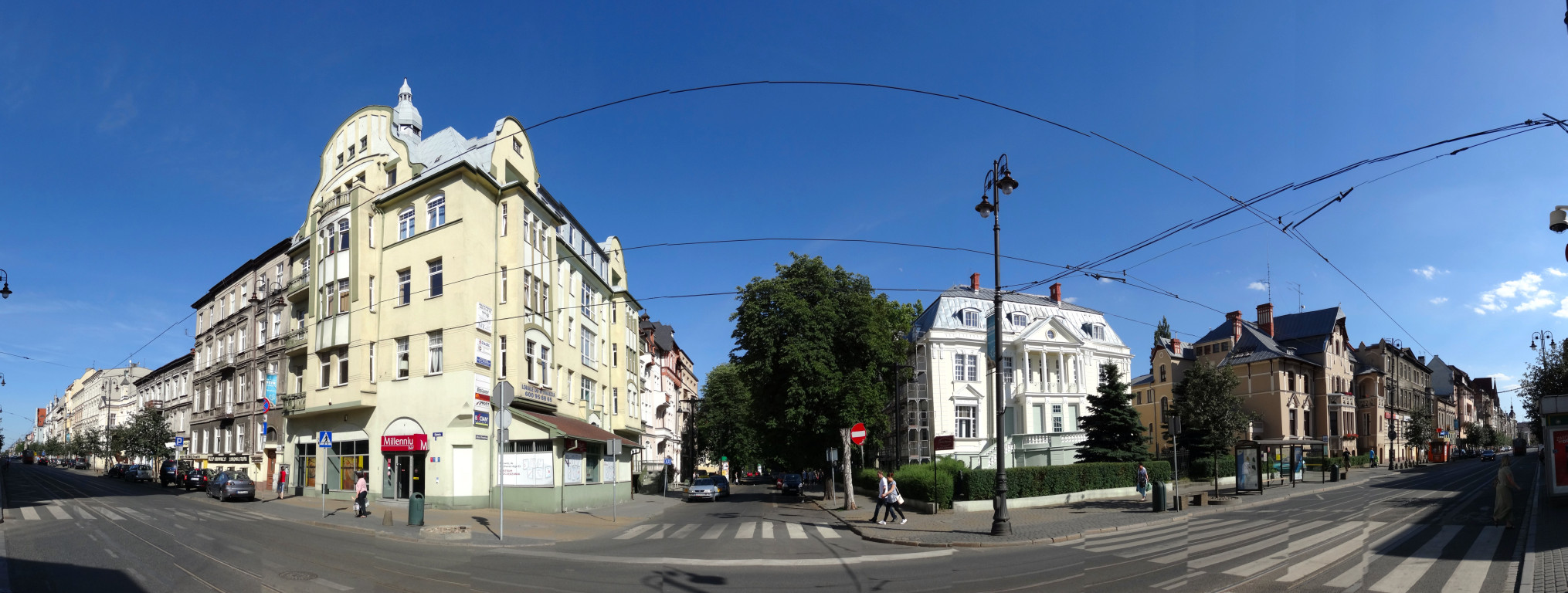
Panorama of Gdańska Street in the vicinity of Villa Wilhelm Blumwe (right side)
