= Villa Heinrich Dietz =

Villa Heinrich Dietz in Bydgoszcz
- Polish: Willa Heinricha Dietza w Bydgoszczy
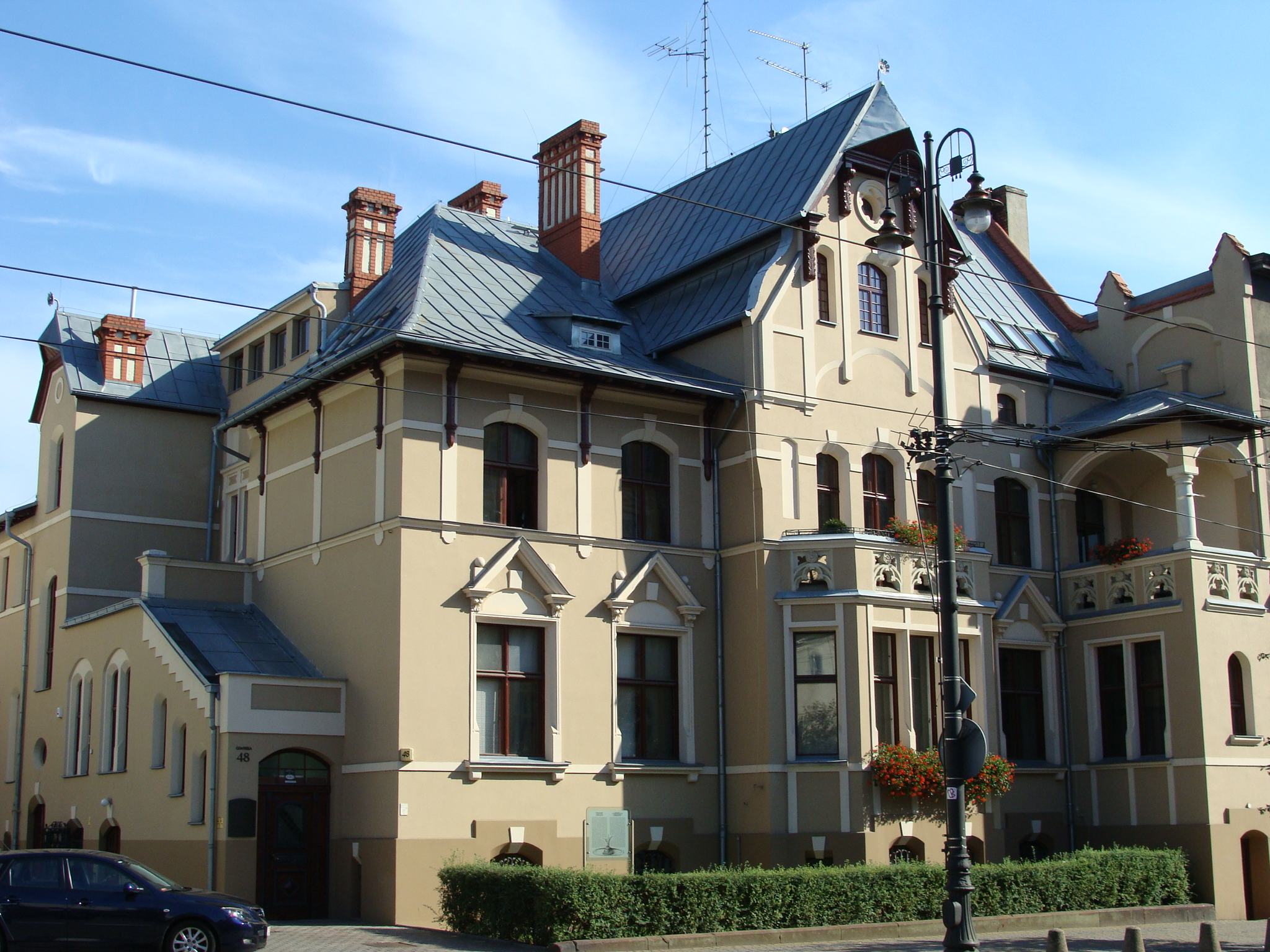
- View from Gdańska Street
- Interactive map of the Villa Heinrich Dietz in Bydgoszcz area

General information
- Type: Villa
- Architectural style: Eclecticism & Neo-Gothic
- Classification: Nr.601301-Reg.A/1128/1-4, 7 July 1992 and 29 September 1998.
- Location: 48 Gdańska Street, Bydgoszcz, Poland, Poland
- Coordinates: 53°7′47″N 18°0′27″E
- Construction started: 1897
- Completed: 1898
- Client: Heinrich Dietz

Technical details
- Floor count: 3

Design and construction
- Architect: Heinrich Seeling

The Villa Heinrich Dietz is a historical house in downtown Bydgoszcz, also called Villa Flora.

== Location ==
The building stands on eastern side of Gdańska Street at Nr.48, between Krasiński and Słowackiego streets.

== History ==
The villa was built in 1897–1898, from a design by design Berlin architect Heinrich Seeling. Initial address was 146 Danzigerstraße, Bromberg.

The owner of the villa, Heinrich Dietz, was a rentier, member of the city council and member of the Prussian parliament. He was the co-founder of the inland navigation company Lloyd which had its seat located downtown, by the riverside. The house remained in the hands of his heirs until 1937.

During Nazi occupation, the building was the seat of SS municipal headquarters. After 1945, it was handed over to Pomerania and Kujawy Polish Radio. Following this, the villa was linked by a covered walkway to the adjacent house, the Villa Wilhelm Blumwe.

In 1995, a thorough renovation of the building occurred, which received an award: Pomerania and Kujawy Polish Radio received a prize by the National Heritage Funds in a competition for the best restoration of a historical building.

== Architecture ==
The villa has been built in the eclectic style, with Neo-Gothic elements and Neo-Renaissance. Perhaps this style was also inspired by the architecture of picturesque English influences. The footprint of the building is irregular but rather close to a rectangle. The outside appearance of the villa is highly fragmented, with various avant-corps, balconies and loggias.

Over the main front elevation (on to Gdańska Street) stands a three-story avant-corps with a balcony, set beneath the gable and the pediment. The second avant-corps located on the northern side has an indoor loggia covered by a lean-to roof. Bricked railings are decorated with a stylized trefoil shapes. In facade decoration are also used volutes and obelisk-shaped pinnacles. A beautifully crafted wood-and-metal door can be notice at the main entry.

The name Villa Flora is related to murals adorning the gone loggia.

The interior of the building is decorated with painted friezes - birds and flowers. Also survived until today a magnificent woodwork and panelling, the ceiling with gold decorations, all made in papier-mâché technique. The backyard (eastern side of the building) is adjacent to a small garden associated with Villa Wilhelm Blumwe, where stands an original 19th-century fountain decorated with polychrome sculpture of herons.

The building has been put on the Kuyavian-Pomeranian Voivodeship Heritage List Nr.601301 Reg.A/1128/1-4, on 7 July 1992 and 29 September 1998.

== Gallery ==
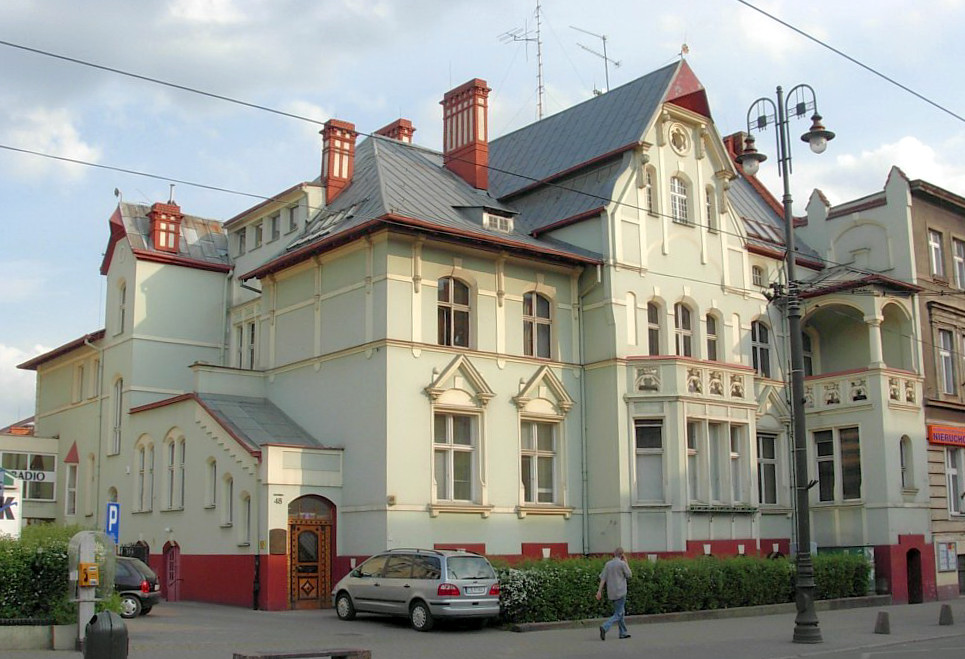
The villa before facade repainting

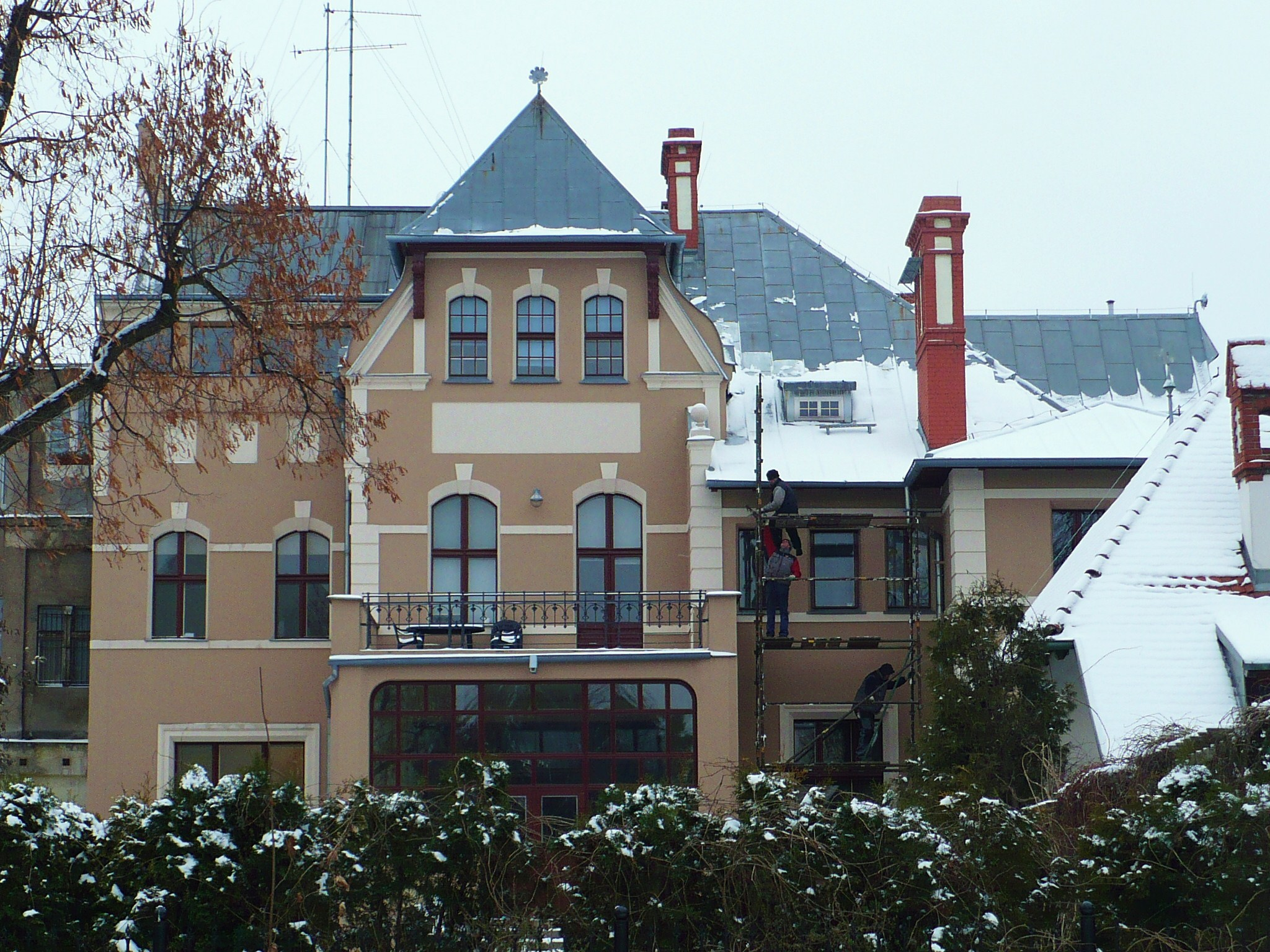
View on eastern side

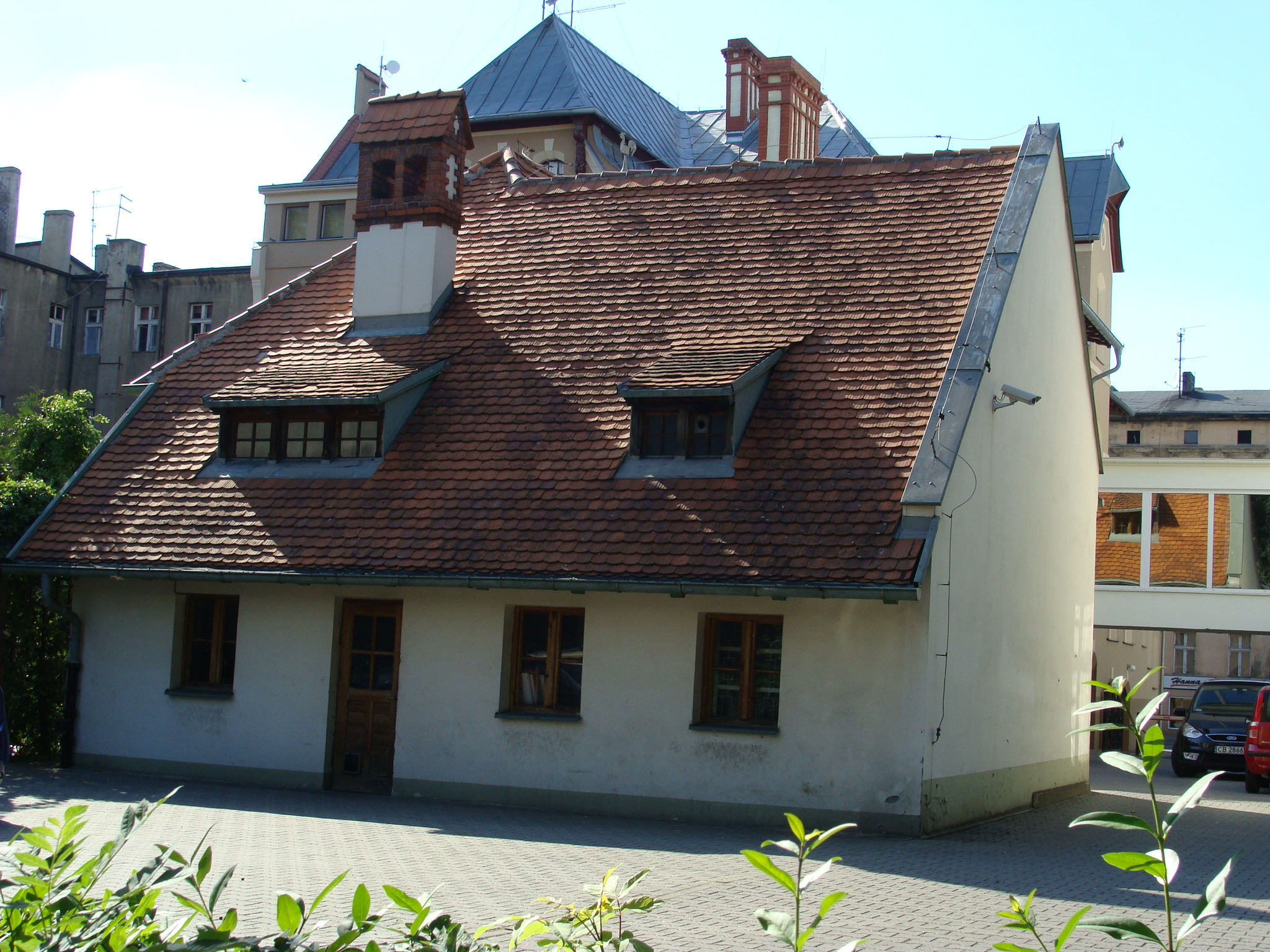
Backyard, part of the covered walkway on the right

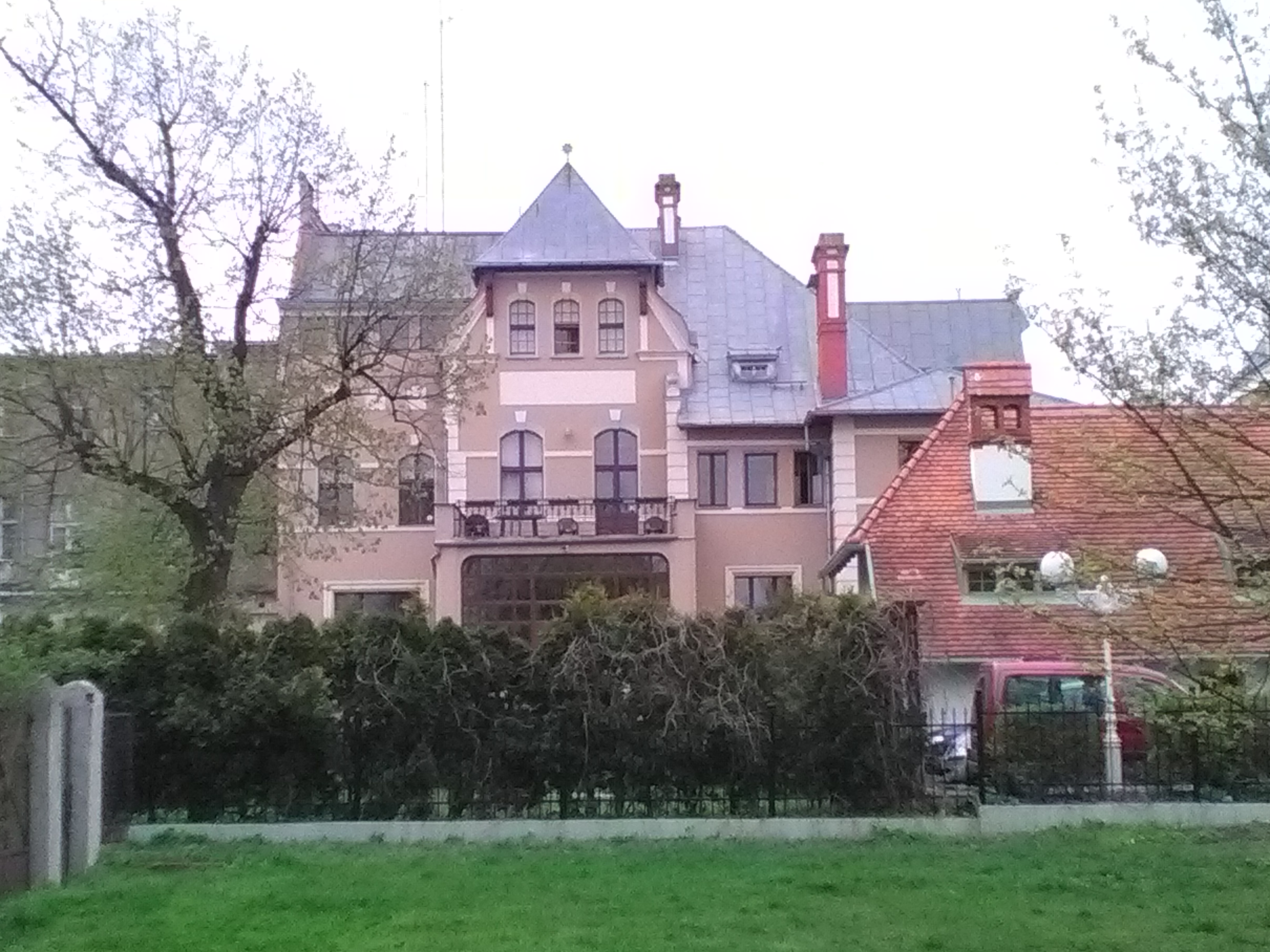
Back View

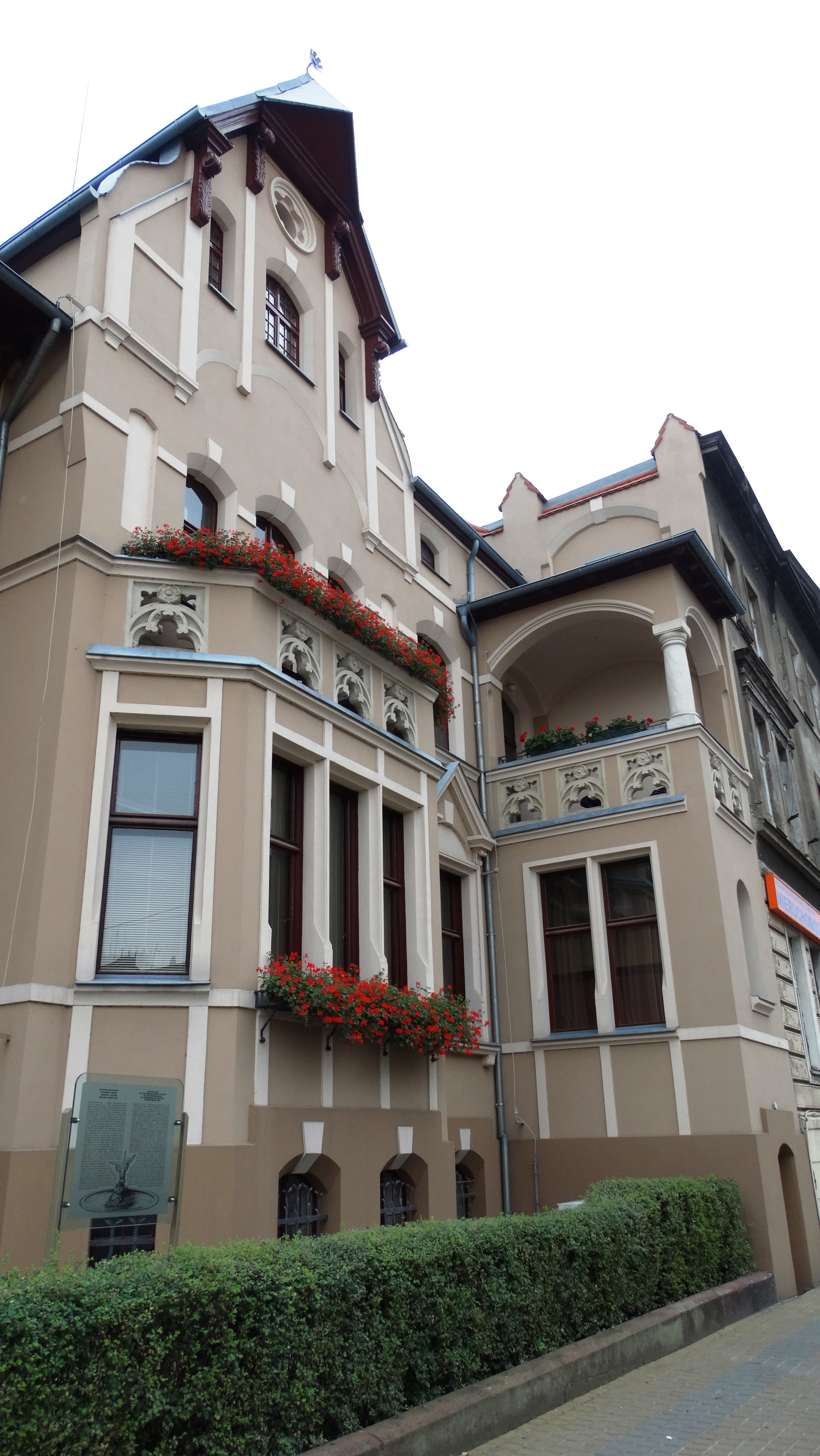
Detailed view on facade's avant-corps

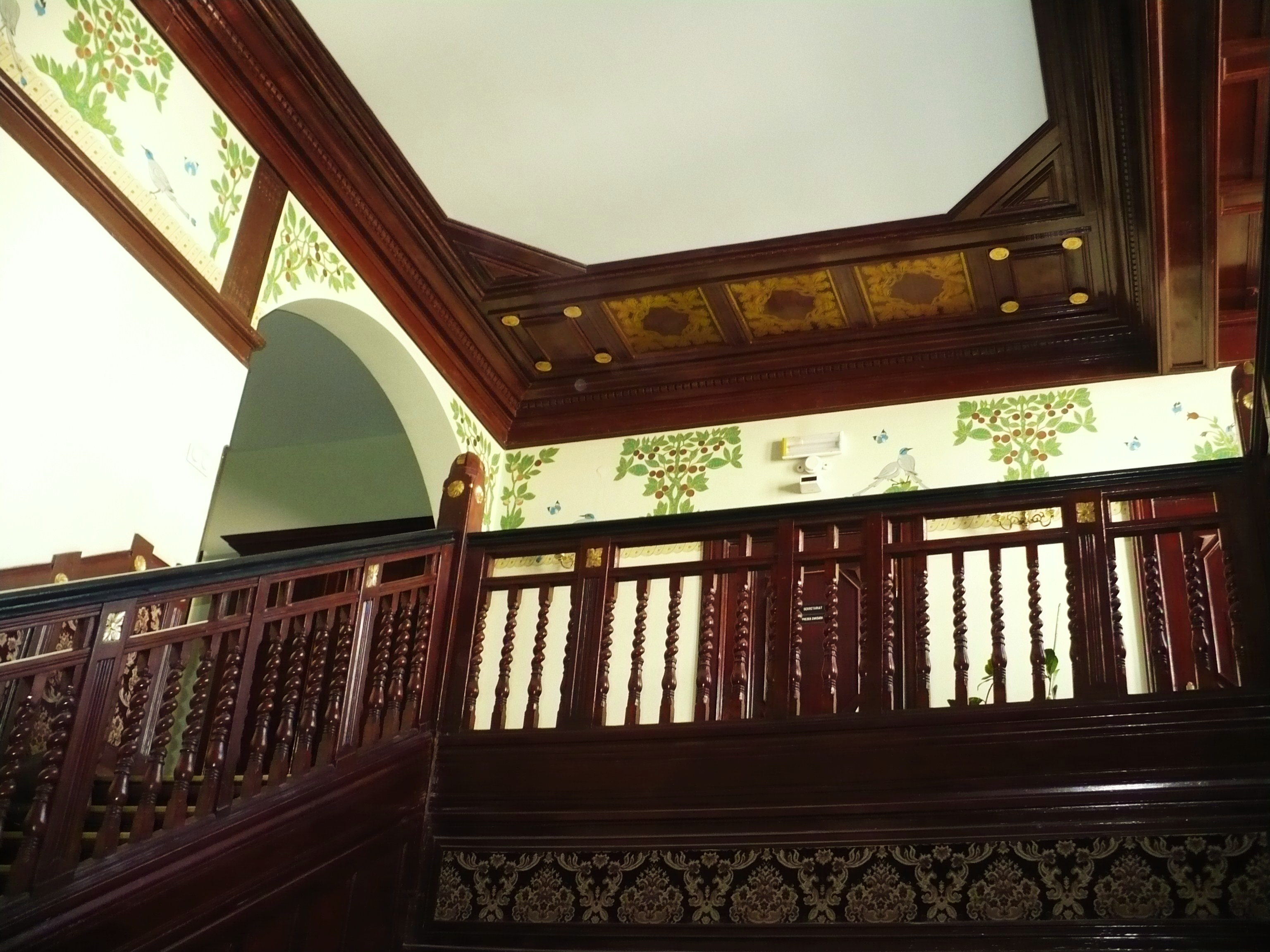
Interior

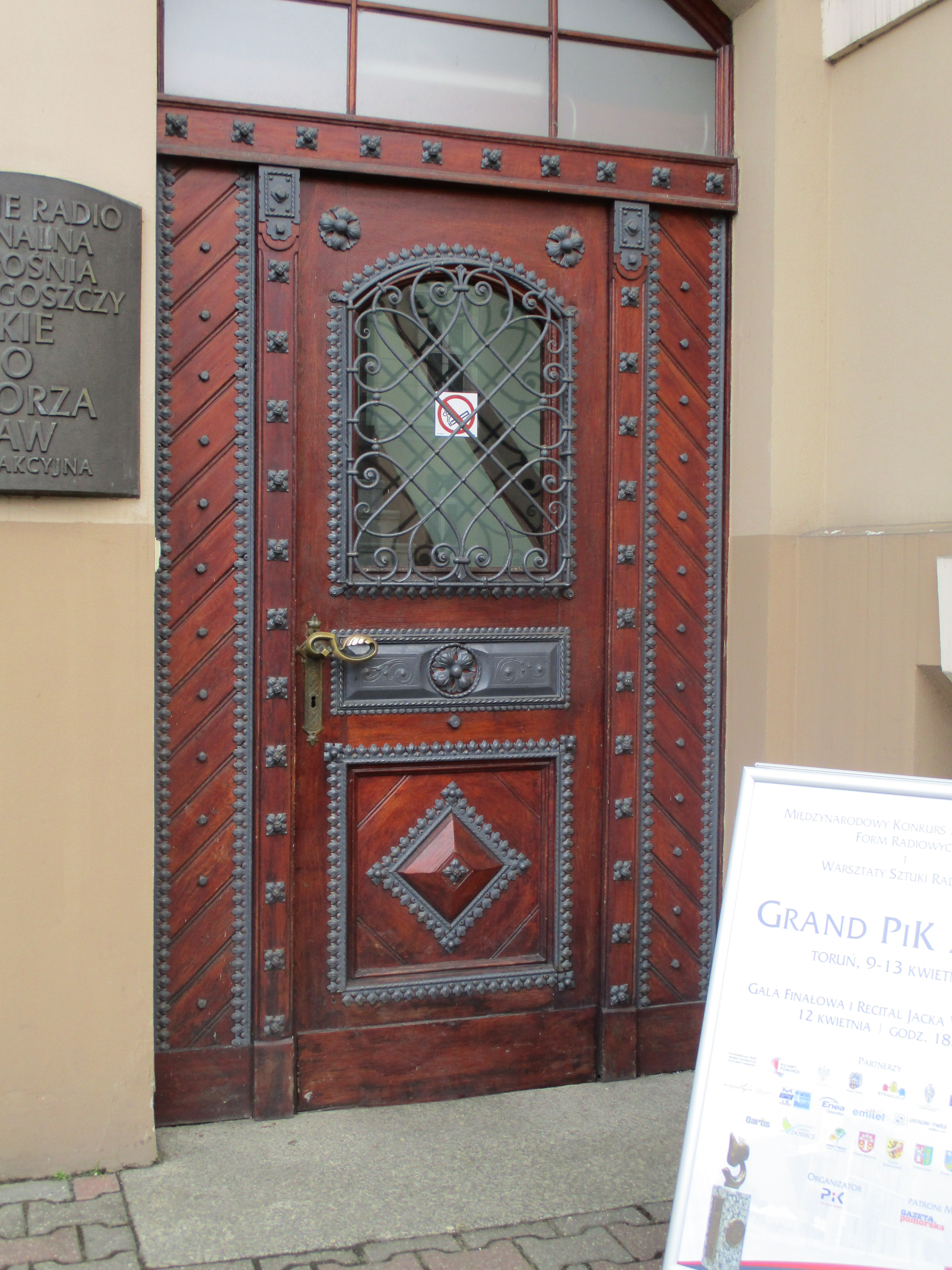
Main door

== See also ==
- Bydgoszcz
- Gdańska Street
- Heinrich Seeling
- Villa Wilhelm Blumwe in Bydgoszcz
- (in Polish) Downtown district in Bydgoszcz

== Bibliography ==
- (in Polish) Bręczewska-Kulesza Daria, Derkowska-Kostkowska Bogna, Wysocka A. (2003). Ulica Gdańska. Przewodnik historyczny. Bydgoszcz: Wojewódzki Ośrodek Kultury w Bydgoszczy. ISBN 9788386970100.
- (in Polish) Bręczewska-Kulesza, Daria (1999). Bydgoskie realizacje Heinricha Seelinga. Materiały do dziejów kultury i sztuki Bydgoszczy i regionu, z.4. Bydgoszcz: Pracownia Dokumentacji i Popularyzacji Zabytków Wojewódzkiego Ośrodka Kultury w Bydgoszczy. pp. 15–38.
- (in Polish) Parucka, Krystyna (2008). Zabytki Bydgoszczy. Bydgoszcz: minikatalog. "Tifen" Krystyna Parucka. ISBN 978-83-927191-0-6.
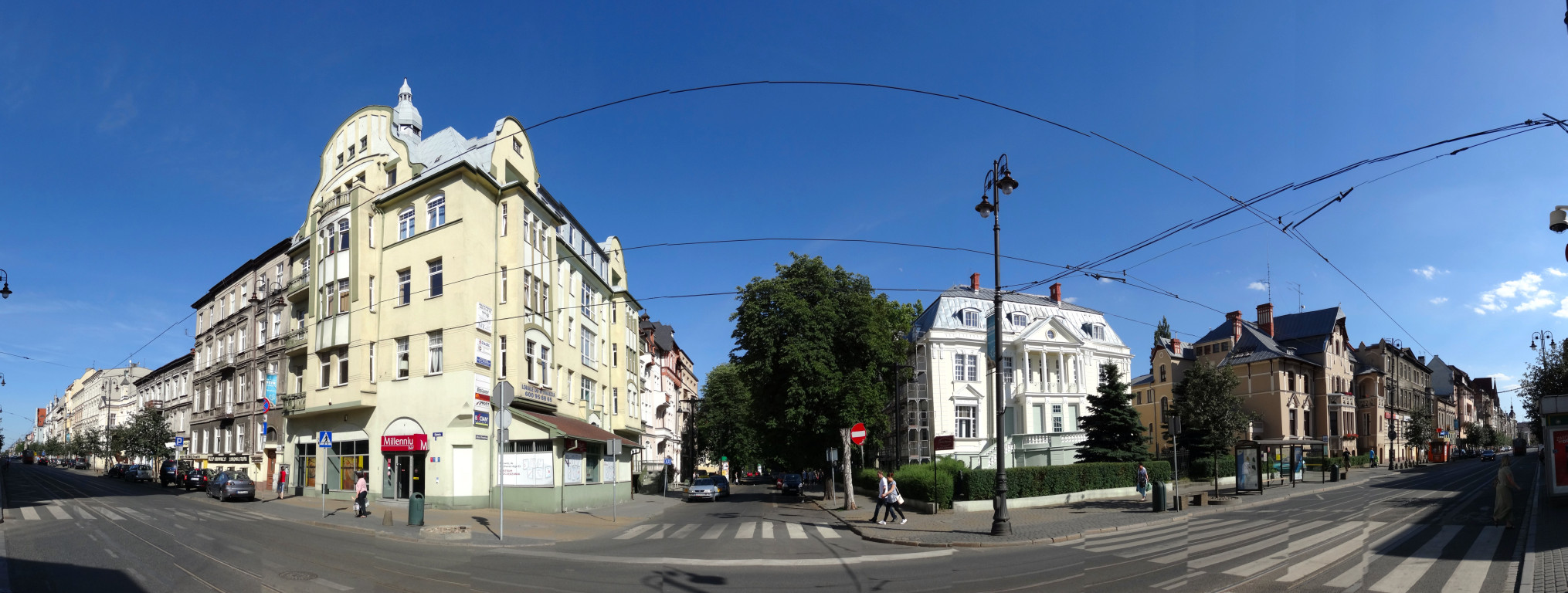
Panorama of Gdańska street in the vicinity of Villa Heinrich Dietz (right side)
