= Heinrich Dietz =

Rentier, politician, philanthropist in Bydgoszcz, Poland (1840–1901)

Heinrich Ernst Dietz
- Born: 13 March 1840; Bromberg, Kingdom of Prussia
- Died: 11 August 1901 (aged 61); Bromberg, German Empire
- Occupations: Rentier, politician
- Years active: 1860s–1890s
- Known for: Bydgoszcz orphanage

Heinrich Ernst Dietz, generally called Heinrich Dietz or Henryk Dietz, (1840–1901) was a Prussian rentier, member of the Bromberg city council, member of the Prussian parliament and a prominent philanthropist in the second half of the 19th century.

== Biography ==
Heinrich ancestors were German colonists who settled in the area after the First Partition of Poland in 1772. The Dietz family branch in Bydgoszcz relates also to Hermann Dietz (1861–1944), a physician and social activist in the city.

Heinrich Dietz was born on 13 March 1840, in Bromberg (name of Bydgoszcz under Prussian rule). His father was August Friedrich Dietz, a locksmith master and his mother Caroline Maria née Geschke. Heinrich Dietz's subsistence came from the small locksmith's workshop, which became later a hardware store at Nowy Rynek in downtown.

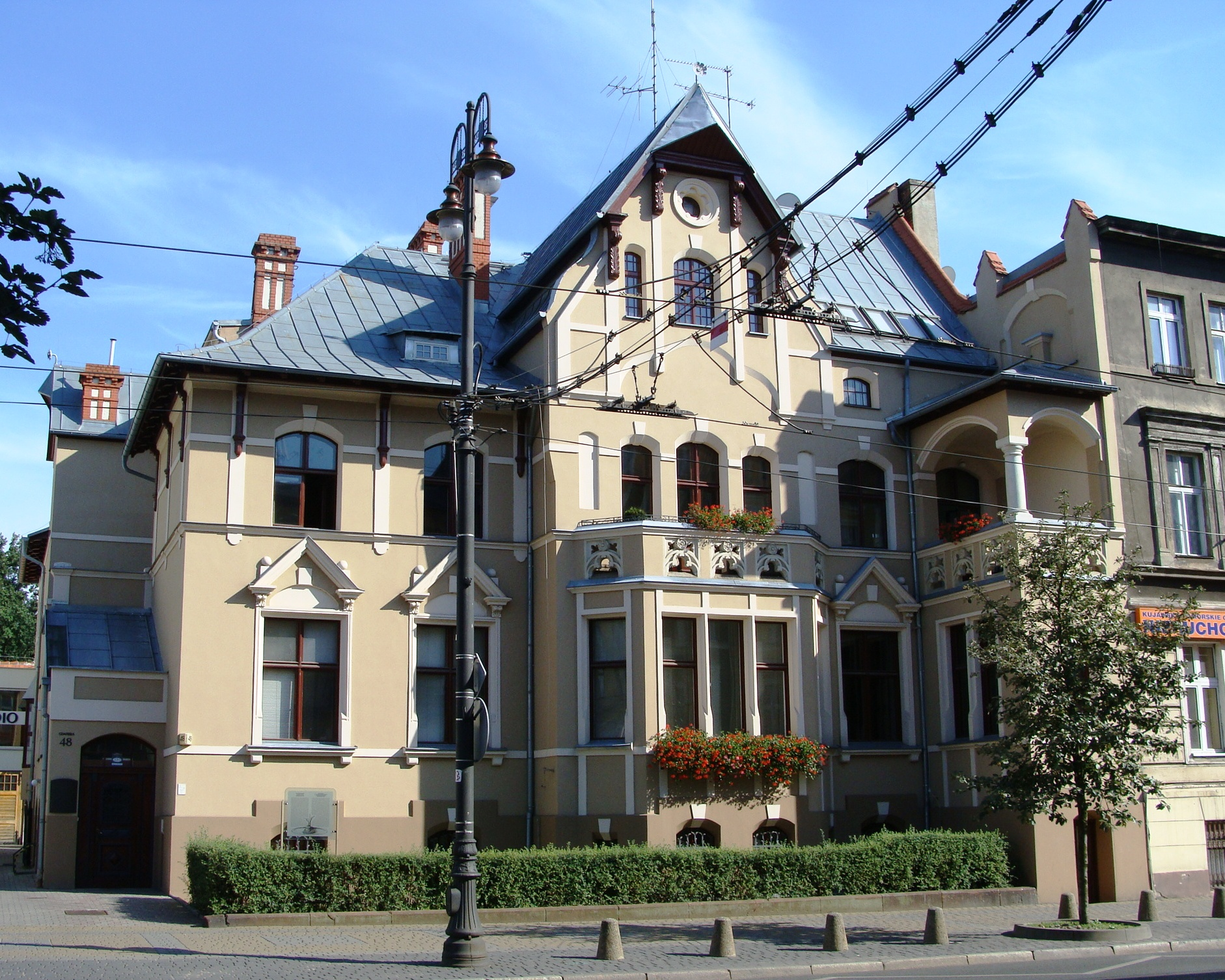
Heinrich Dietz villa in Gdańska Street

In 1867, Heinrich inherited his father's company. The store grew into a relatively large warehouse for iron, metal sheets and small items. As a deeply Prussian patriot, H. Dietz participated to the initiative to build a monument for William I, the German Emperor who died on 9 March 1888. The funding group mainly consisted of entrepreneurs, officials and landowners, such as Lewin Louis Aronsohn, Hermann Franke, Ludwig Kolwitz or Georg Werckmeister. Eventually, the unveiling ceremony of the statue riding a horse took place on 17 September 1893, on Plac Wolnosci (then Weltzienplatz).

In 1892, he retired from the business and became a Rentier (property owner): he sold his shop to Paul Eckert, a merchant from Bydgoszcz. He then invested the capital in 1894, into the Bydgoszcz Shipping and Towing joint-stock Company as a member of the supervisory board (German: Bromberger Schleppschiffahrt Aktien Gesellschaft – Polish: Bydgoskie Towarzystwo Żeglugi Holowniczej Spółka Akcyjna) which became later the Lloyd Bydgoski. Eventually, the company, apart from transport barges, had its own shipyards, sawmills, brickyards and distilleries. The prosperous development of the thriving firm made him a very wealthy man: as such, after his demise in 1901, the assets bequeathed in his will were estimated at 2 million Marks. In 1898, Heinrich left his house at Nowy Rynek to a newly built villa at 48 Gdańska Street, then registered as 146 Danzigerstraße, which he had commissioned to the famous architect Heinrich Seeling.

He was married two times, his second wife and universal heir was Maria née Beleites. Dietz had several children.

He died on 11 August 1901, in Bromberg. He was buried in the Evangelical cemetery then located at Jagiellońska street: in 1945, the cemetery was closed and transferred to the Lutheran cemetery in Zaświat Street.

== Political career ==
As one of the richest citizen of Bromberg, his status allowed him to engage in political and social activities in the city. From 1874 to 1881, he was a member of the City Council in Bromberg. On 24 February 1881, in a by-election he was entrusted with the position of (unpaid) councilor of the magistrate, which he kept until his death. As a member of the magistrate, he was also the curator of the Municipal Savings Bank, managed the city repository and participated in the work of the housing and supply committee and the municipal office of weights and measures.

In 1879, he became a member of the Province of Posen assembly. From 1894 to 1898, Dietz was a member of the Prussian parliament in Berlin, representing the Wyrzysk-Bromberg district with the support of the National Liberal Party.

In 1894, Heinrich was one of the founding members of the Bromberg branch of the German Eastern Marches Society or Hakata, a radical, extremely nationalist and xenophobic organization: he was a member of the main board of this society.

== Philanthropy ==
In 1889 and 1901, Henryk Dietz made two wills, through which he donated nearly a quarter of his assets to charity. In these documents opened on 26 August 1901, he donated to the city the following funds:

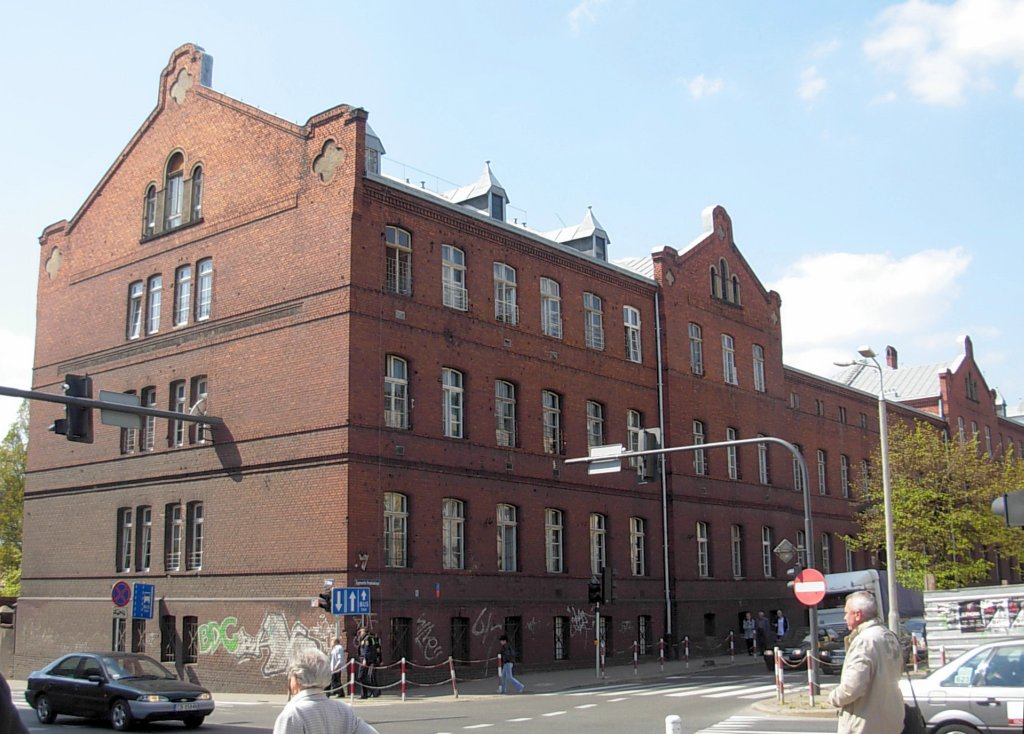
Educational Centre for Blind Children, Krasińskiego street

- 30,000 marks for the maintenance of the Municipal Civic Hospital (German: German städtisches Bürger Hospital) at 15 Jakob Straße (present

day 43 Grudziądzka street);

- 10,000 marks awarded to the Department for Blind Children of the Poznań Province (German: Blinden Anstalt der Provinz Posen) at 4 Fröhner Straße (today's 10 Krasińskiego street;
- 300,000 marks allocated to the construction, equipment and maintenance of a municipal orphanage (German: städtisches Waisenhaus).

In the testament, H. Dietz even specified that the orphanage was to be called the Henryk Dietz Foundation (German: Heinrich Dietz’sche Stiftung). As far as possible, the institution should accept children from all faiths Evangelical, Catholic and Jewish, while the management of this foundation was to be composed only of Evangelical members of the municipality and city residents. The orphanage would be supervised by the city hall. In addition, the will stated that the bequeathed funds should not be used for the already existing city orphanage, then located on a plot at the crossing of Waisenhaus straße and Kujavier straße (Sieroca and Kujawska streets): it was established in 1871 and was liquidated when the Dietz orphanage was completed.

In the end, the overall capital donated to the city for the future Henryk Dietz Foundation exceeded 438 000 German gold marks. Due to legal procedures, the implementation of the requested investment was delayed by a couple of years after H. Dietz death, the reason being that the colossal size of the bequest had to be approved by the administrative offices of the German Emperor so as establish the procedure did not violate the rights of the heirs.

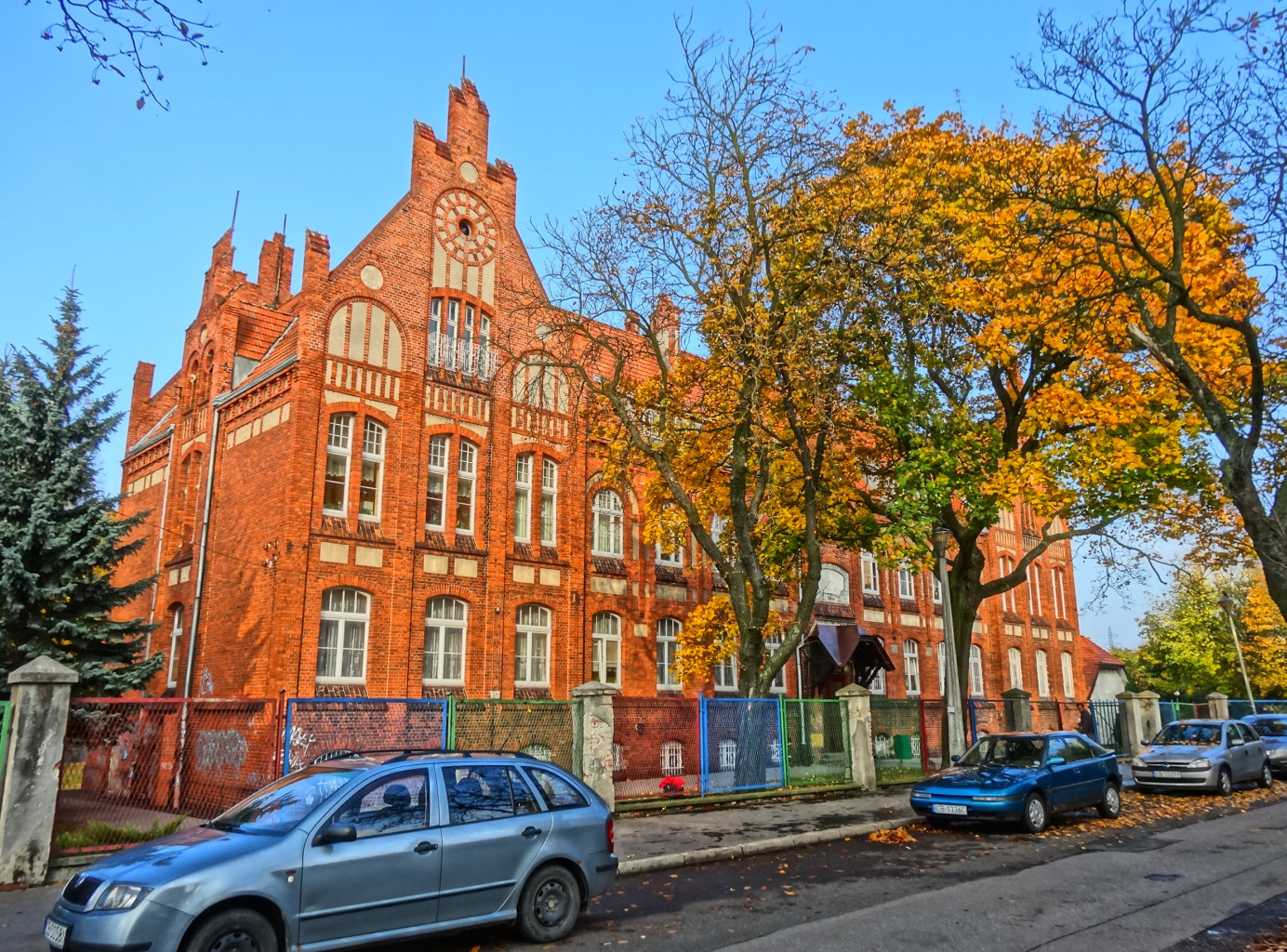
H. Dietz orphanage building today

The suburban village of Schwedenhoche (in today's Szwederowo district), on the heights of Bromberg, was identified to host the edifice. On the plot purchased by the city, the one-story edifice encompassed with 10 rooms, a dining room, two bedrooms, two study and handicraft rooms, a chapel and a kitchen. Furthermore, an adjoining vegetable garden and an orchard were also created, and a separate building with a playroom and gymnastic house. The orphanage was looking after 30 to 40 children from 6 to 16 years old. The ensemble was officially inaugurated on 18 July 1907. As requested in the will, a municipal decision of 27 November 1908, named the orphanage after Heinrich Dietz (German: Heinrich-Dietzchen-Waisenhaus).

In 1906, the city authorities aimed as well to give the philanthropist name to one of the streets connecting Neuer Markt (Nowy Rynek) with Wollmarkt (Wool Market square), where runs today the Melchiora Wierzbickiego street. However, his widow suggested instead to rename the street where the orphanage was standing, which happened two years later.

Designated Heinrich Dietz street under the Prussian period (1908), the path retained its calling during the interwar period. In 1945, it was changed to Romuald Traugutt street.

== See also ==
- Bydgoszcz
- Villa Heinrich Dietz in Bydgoszcz
- Hermann Dietz
- List of Polish people

== Bibliography ==
- (in Polish) Błażejewski Stanisław, Kutta Janusz, Romaniuk Marek (1995). Bydgoski Słownik Biograficzny. Tom II. Bydgoszcz: Kujawsko-Pomorskie Towarzystwo Kulturalne Wojewódzki Ośrodek Kultury. pp. 52–53. ISBN 8385327274.
