= Blumwes' buildings in Bydgoszcz =

Coordinates: 53°7′25″N 18°00′30″E

Blumwe family
- Entrepreneurs
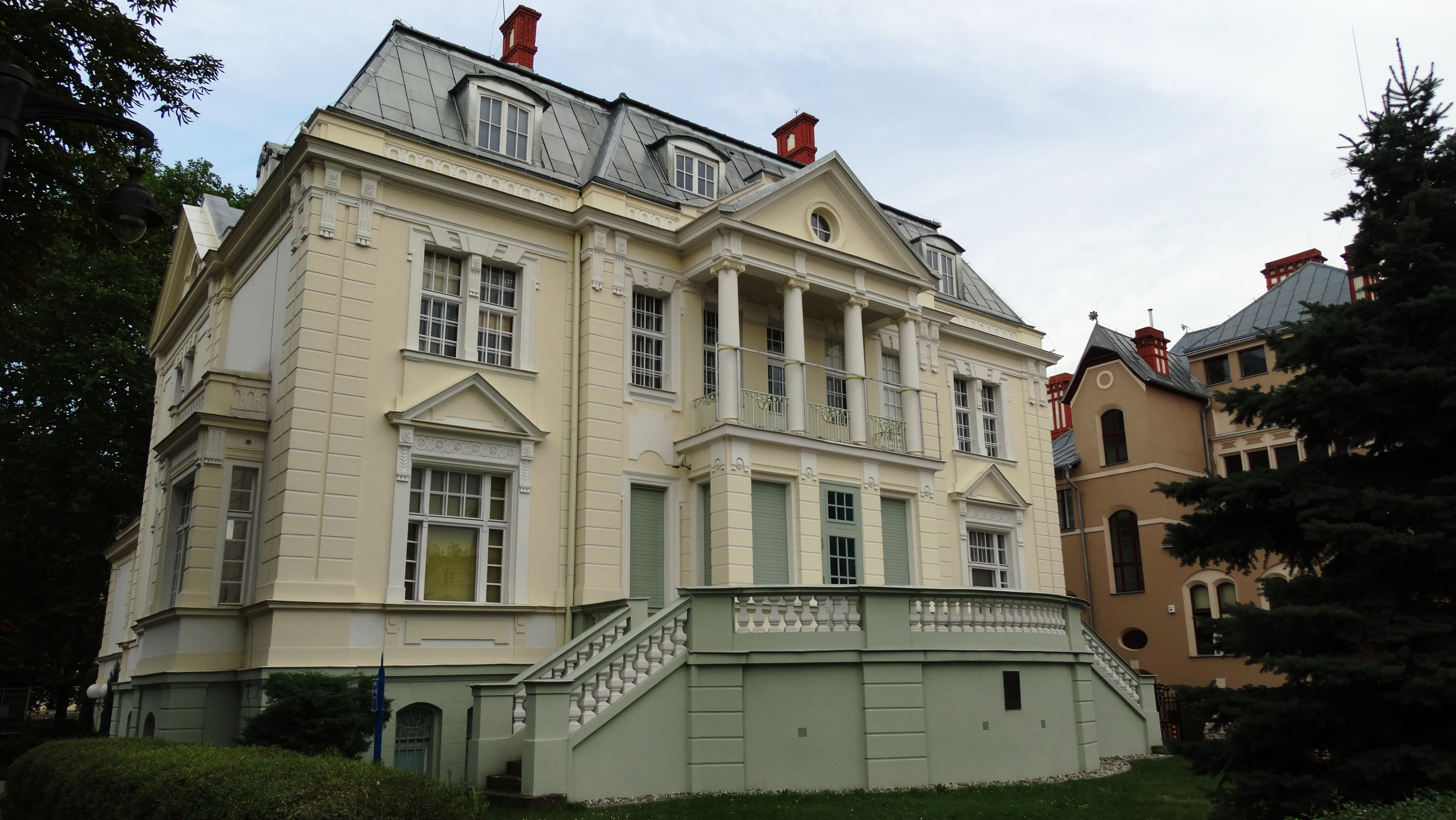
- View of Wilhelm Blumwe Villa in Gdańska Street
- Country: Kingdom of Prussia, German Empire
- Current region: Bydgoszcz, Poland
- Origin: Chojnice
- Founded: 1850
- Founder: Carl Blumwe
- Dissolution: 1903

Carl and Wilhelm Blumwe were German entrepreneurs, industrialists and businessmen in Bydgoszcz from the second half of the 19th century. Buildings connected to them are listed on several heritage lists.

== Villa Wilhelm Blumwe ==
The building was erected between 1900 and 1904 by architect Hildebrandt from Berlin. The investor was Wilhelm Blumwe, son of Carl Blumwe. It has the classical shape of a palace, with a style referring to Palladian architecture, popular in Europe in the late 19th century.

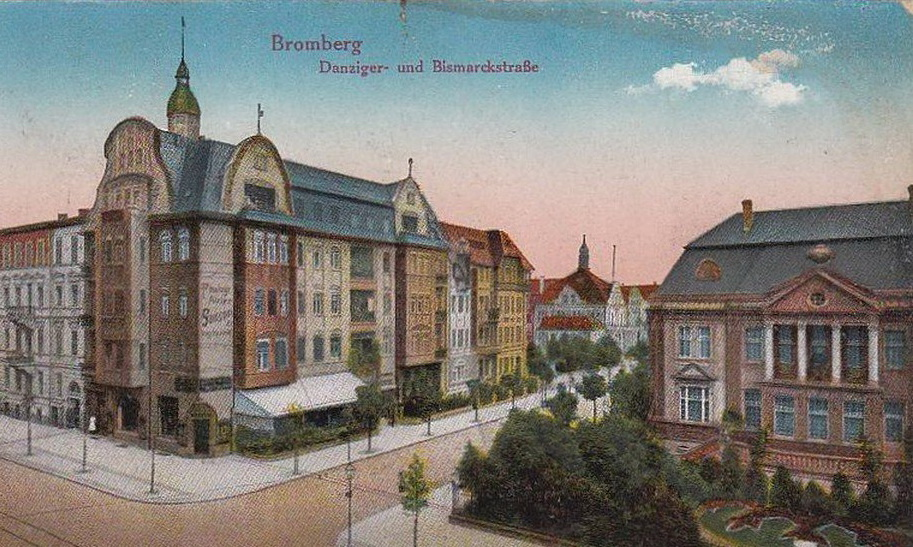
Villa Wilhelm Blumwe 1907 (right side)

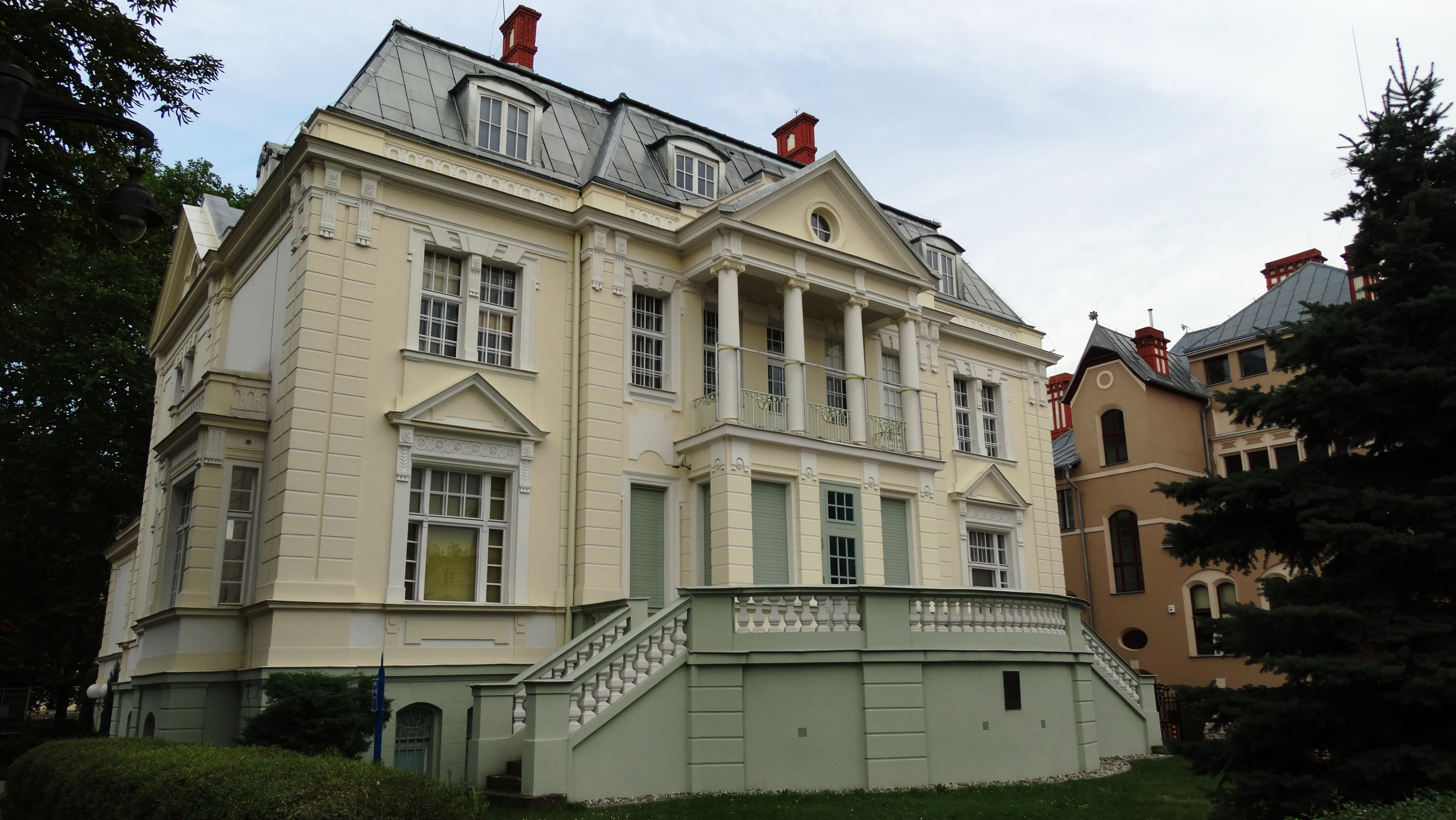
View from Gdańska street

== Villa Carl Blumwe ==
The Villa Carla Blumwe is a former industrial building that belonged to factory managers Carl and Wilhelm Blumwe. The building is located at Nakielska street 53 in Bydgoszcz. Its architectural features can be connected with identical industry-related edifices from the second half of the 19th century in Łódź and Warsaw.

The construction of the Villa happened in several stages, led by the successful development of the neighbouring "Factory of Machine Tools for wood", on which plot it has been built. The oldest part of the premises, made of wattle and daub, was built in the 1850s, while its north façade, erected only in 1879, is made of bricks as a single-storey building with a separate entrance.

On 12 December 1892 Wilhelm Blumwe applied for the reconstruction and expansion of his a dwelling house. He asked designer Carl Stampehl, a master mason and carpenter, to realize this project. At this time, Carl Stampehl was already known for designing tenements in Gdańska Street (No. 16 and Nr.22). For the villa, Carl Stampehl carried out in 1893:

- the reconstruction of the old house's interior;
- the addition of an attic;
- the building of a columned column porch.

A tower was also added on the western part, along with a new wing devoted to business offices. All architectural details on the facade were revamped, giving a uniformity to the structure. Another building addition was performed in 1900. After World War II, an intensive refurbishing outside and inside has obliterated a major part of architectural details. Throughout its existence, the villa was part of "Factory of Machine Tools for wood".

The building design refers to rich neo-Baroque villas. The oldest eastern part has an asymmetrical facade, with a wooden cornice supported by corbels and a wattle and daub wall, filled with ceramic bricks. The brick office building reminds strongly of the industrialists' realisations from the end of the 19th century. The southern main entrance is preceded by a porch, only survival a two-column shaped portico. Above the door is placed a cornice, with a cartouche supported by two putti. The facade of the tower has bossage stones topped with friezes, with symbolic crossed hammers below each windows. Above is set is Mansard roof capped by a bulging, wrought-iron spire.

The villa represents an eclectic style of architecture, with much brick and a clear predominance of neo-Baroque elements. The style and richly adorned façade onto the street identified the social position of the family industrialists who owned the villa.

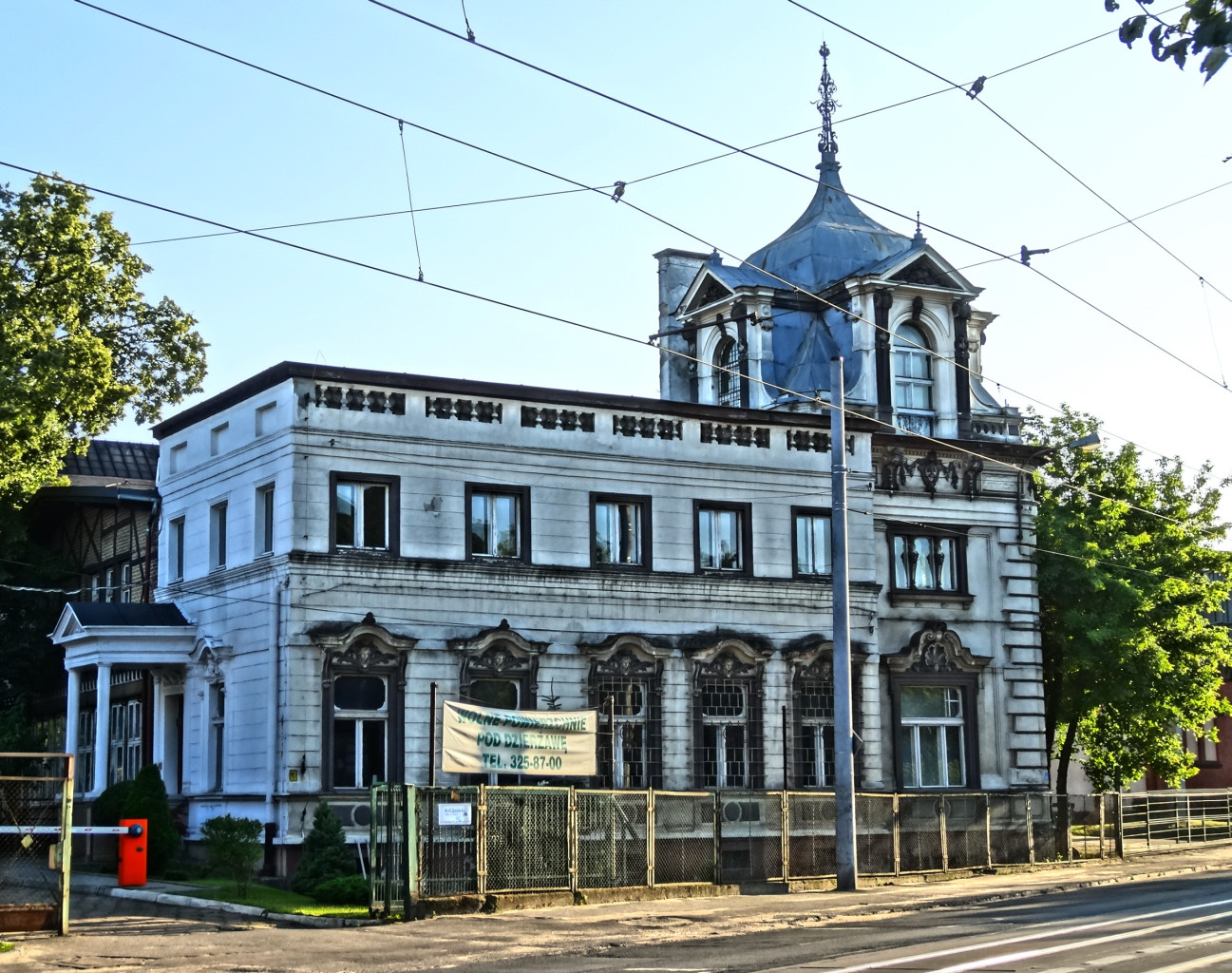
View from Nakielska street

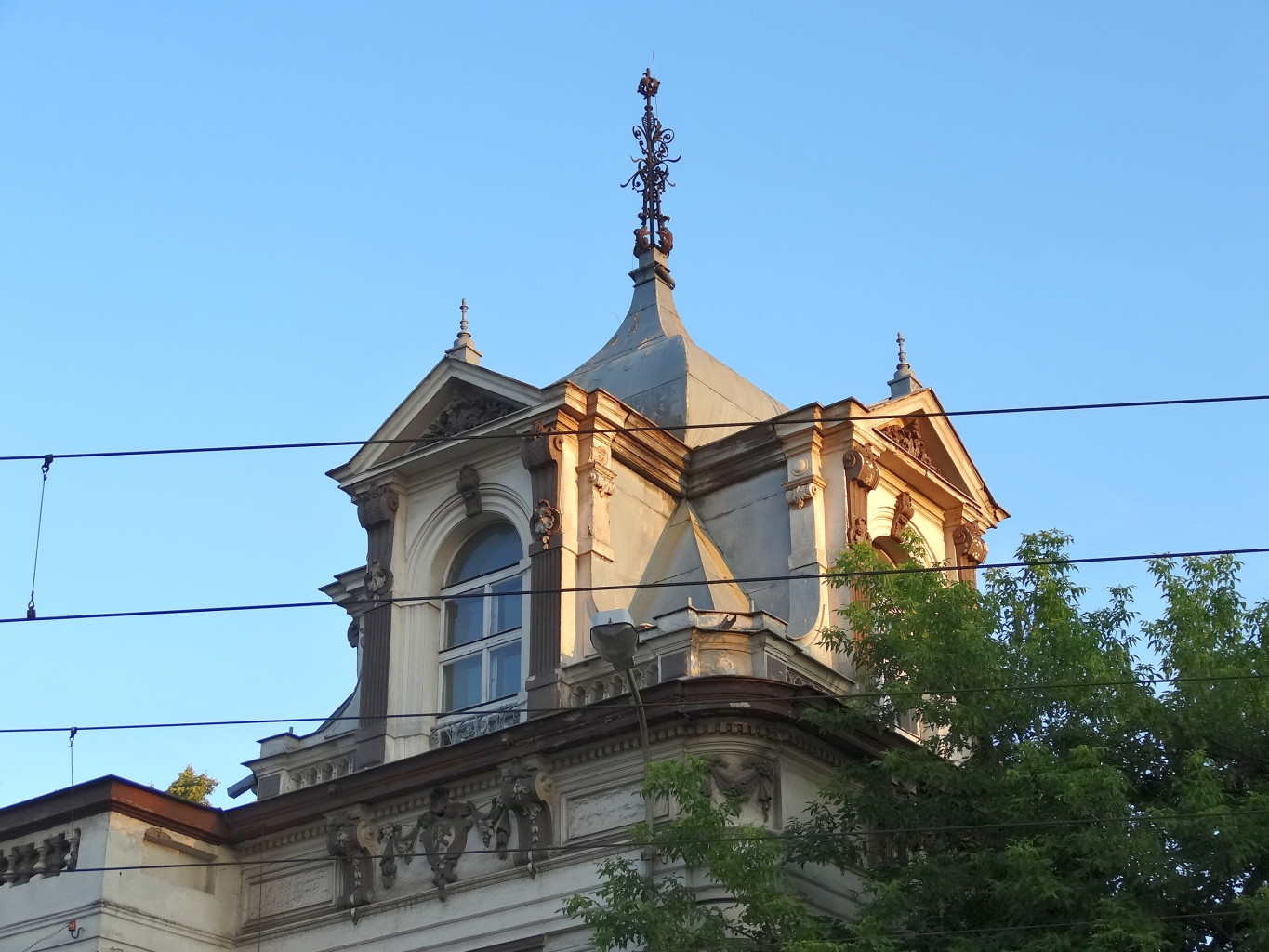
Tower and its finial

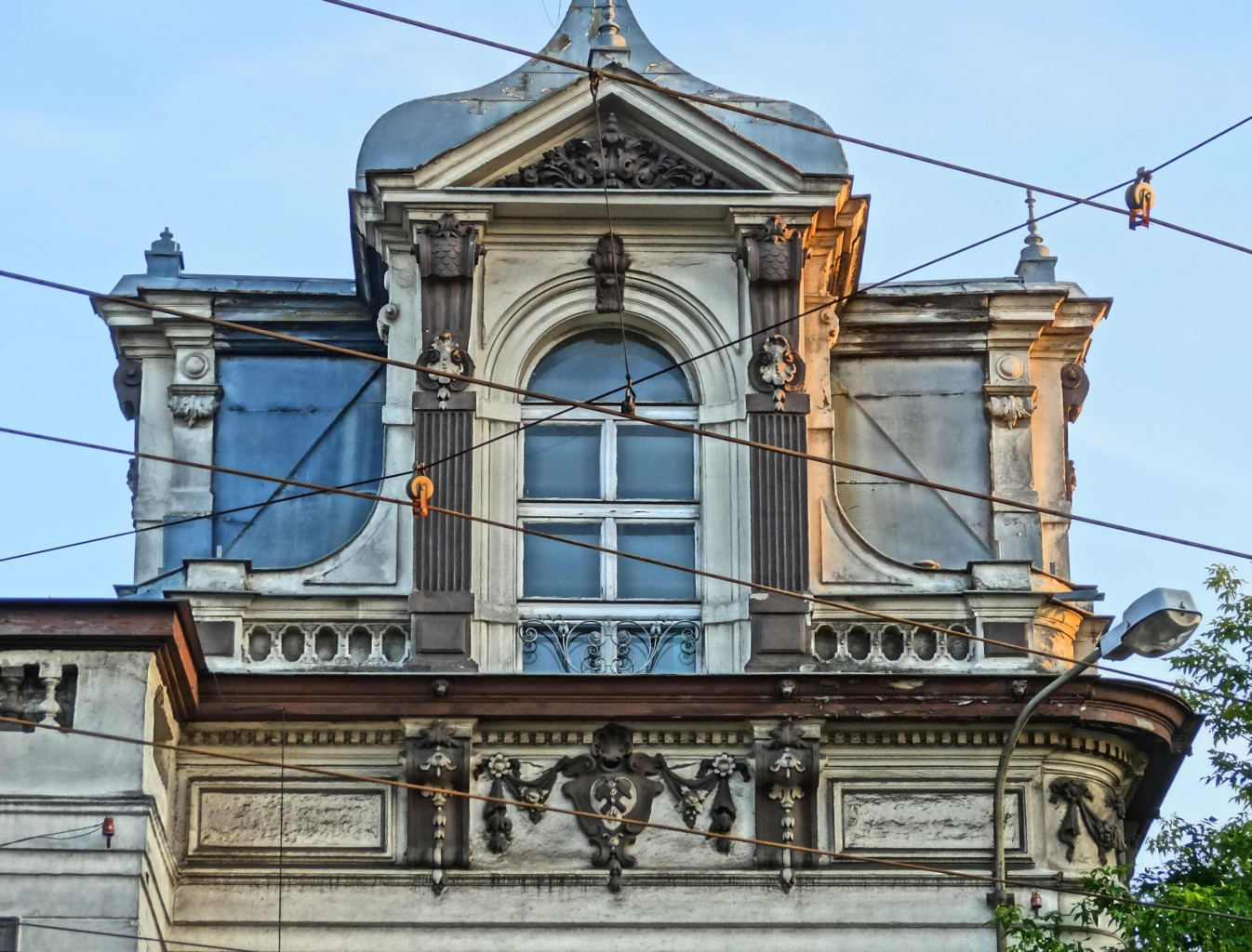
Detail of the Mansard roof

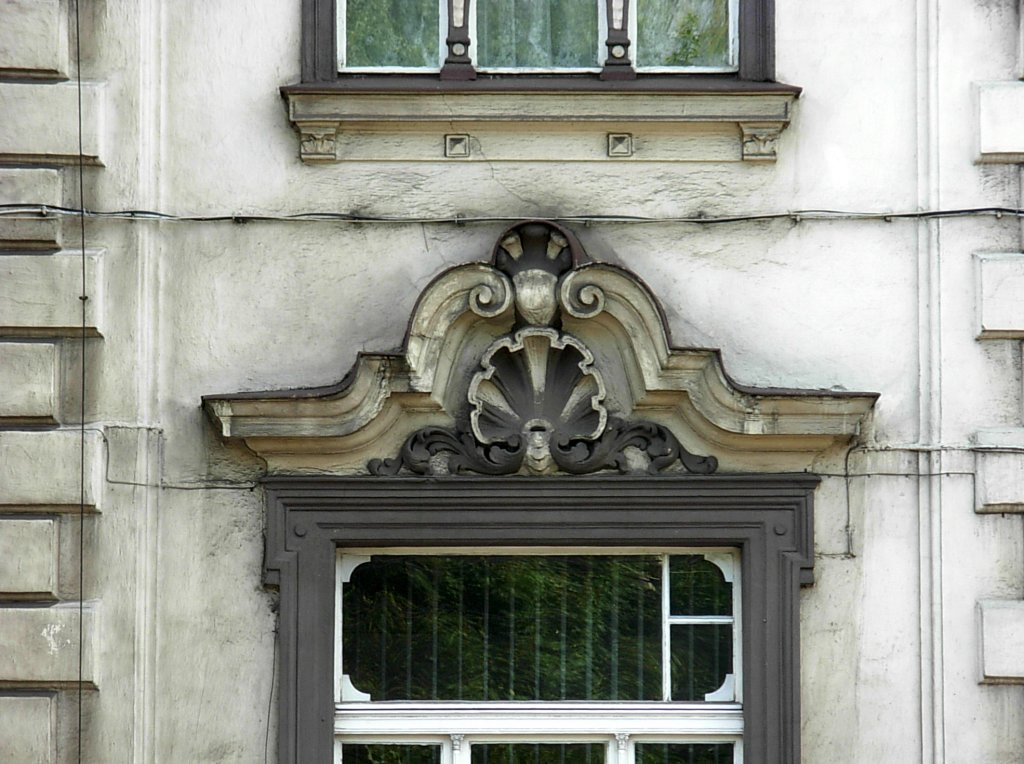
Detail of a pediment

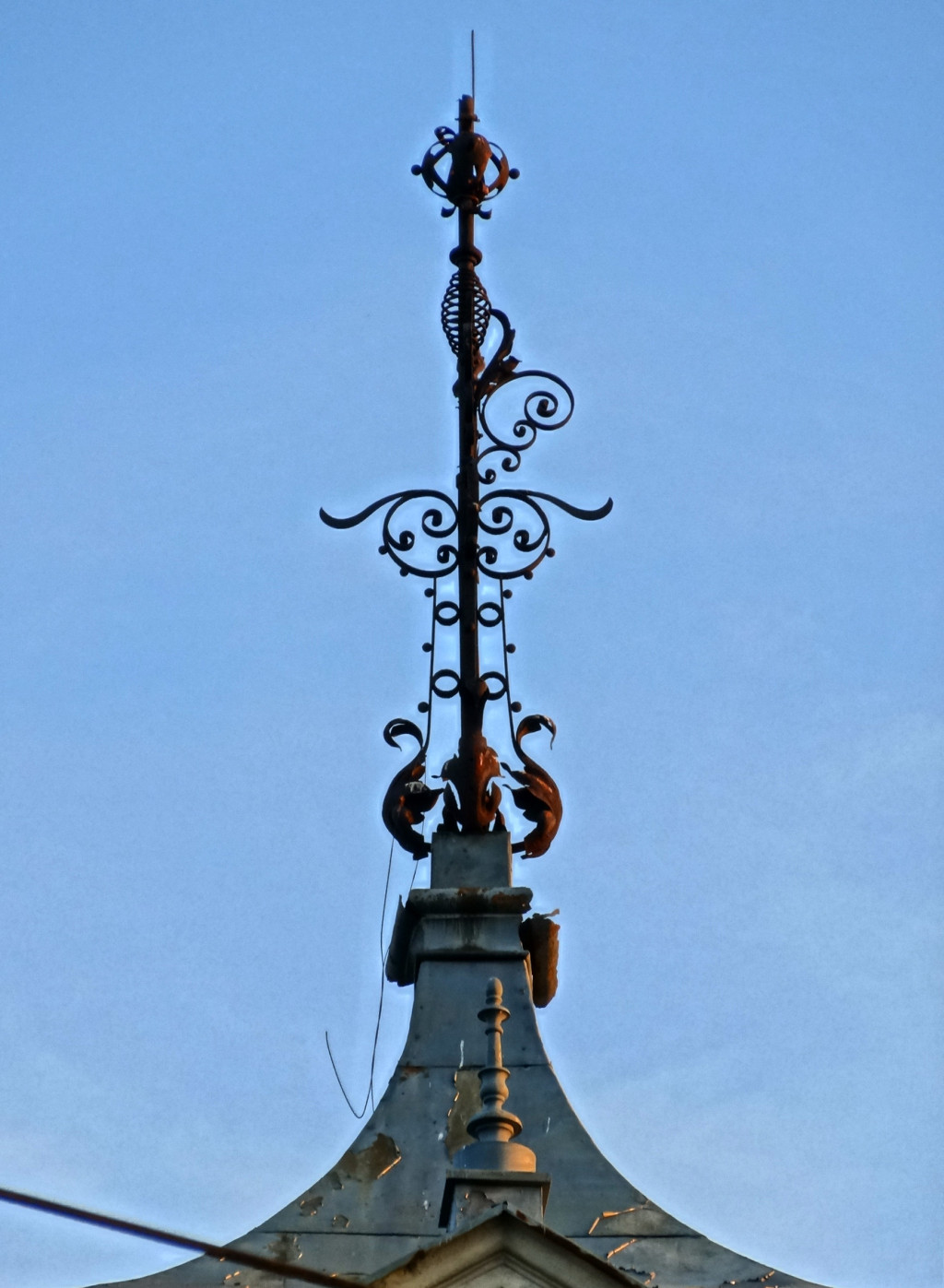
Detail of the finial

== Factory of Machine Tools for wood ==
=== History ===
Fabryka Obrabiarek do Drewna (FOD) is one of the oldest (1865) active companies in Bydgoszcz, producing machines and equipment for wood processing, and now also complete technological lines for the wood industry. It is the oldest in Poland company in its sector. The plot was initially occupied by a paper mill as early as 1802, then welcomed in 1839 the first machine production plant in Bydgoszcz, "Plagemann's agricultural equipment factory".

Looking for a better location for its plant, Carl Blumwe bought in 1878 a piece of land with buildings from the widow of an iron foundry owner, Julius Schmidt, in Wilczak district (now Nakielska St. 53). The same year, the company turned to his son Wihelm who changed its business name to "Carl Blumwe and Son" (German: C. Blumwe & Sohn Eisengießerei in. Special - Fabrik für Patentwagenachsen und Holzbearbeitungsmaschinen). In 1886, the plant employed more than 100 workers, and expanded its production to steam engines.

The Bydgoszcz wood harbour, established in 1879 and expanded in 1905–1917, contributed significantly to the rapid development of the local timber industry after 1890. The entire local timber industry has developed using the waterway transit to Germany, employing 6,200 people at its peak, and enabled the development of enterprises producing machines and equipment for woodworking. Wilhelm Blumwe modernized its plant with technical improvements and transformed it into a joint stock company in 1897. The company had seats in Berlin, Magdeburg, Cologne, and goods exported, among others, to China, United States and Africa. Wilhelm Blumwe died in 1903.

During the interwar period, FOD corporation was incorporated as a subsidiary to the company's "Pomeranian Grudziądz Machine Factory SA". On 1 July 1928 the Bydgoszcz branch - formerly C. Blumwe and Son - became independent under the name "Factory Thracians and Machines for Metal Woods". After the Great Depression, in 1931, the factory employment had fallen to 100 people, to 50 people in 1930. The re-development of the factory started up in 1935–1939.

After the outbreak of World War II and Nazi occupation of Bydgoszcz, the company was confiscated by the German Central Office Trust - East. They put back the original German company name, i.e. "Fabrik für Holzverarbeitungsmaschinen Blumwe und Co. AG". The factory was militarized, but continued its production of machinery and equipment for the wood industry.

In 1945, in the first days after the liberation Bydgoszcz, the plant resumed its operations. Initially the factory started to produce for the military, but quickly returned to its original production profile, satisfying the needs of the timber industry. In the years 1950–1955, the plant was expanded according to the Six-Year Plan, which granted priority to the expansion of heavy industry. In 1970 decision was made to specialize the plant in the production lines for the sawmill industry.

In November 2011, Minister of Finance has announced a public offer for the sale of 85% of the share capital of the company. This offer comprised the sale of the plot at Nakielska street 129/131. Since 2012–2013, buildings at Nr.131 have been cleaned out to allow the construction of a residence complex. The brick edifice at Nr.129 still remains.

The ensemble at 55/57, sold out in May 2020, will be partially torn down to give way to a large real estate project.

=== Architecture ===
The factory complex has been built in the second half of the 19th century, to the like of well-known industrial similar buildings in Łódź or Warsaw. Owner's villa has been erected within the plant area. The factory building is connected to the prestigious residential and office, emphasizing the social status of the manufacturer, while at the same time contrasting with the austere, brick-architecture of the factory halls.

From the historical ensemble, buildings still preserved to this day are:

- "Carl Blumwe" Villa, in a Neo-Baroque style, used as an office building (1850–1900);
- The assembly hall (1896–1897), with a Neo-gothic facade;
- The lathe ward, now the gatekeeper lodge (1895–1900).
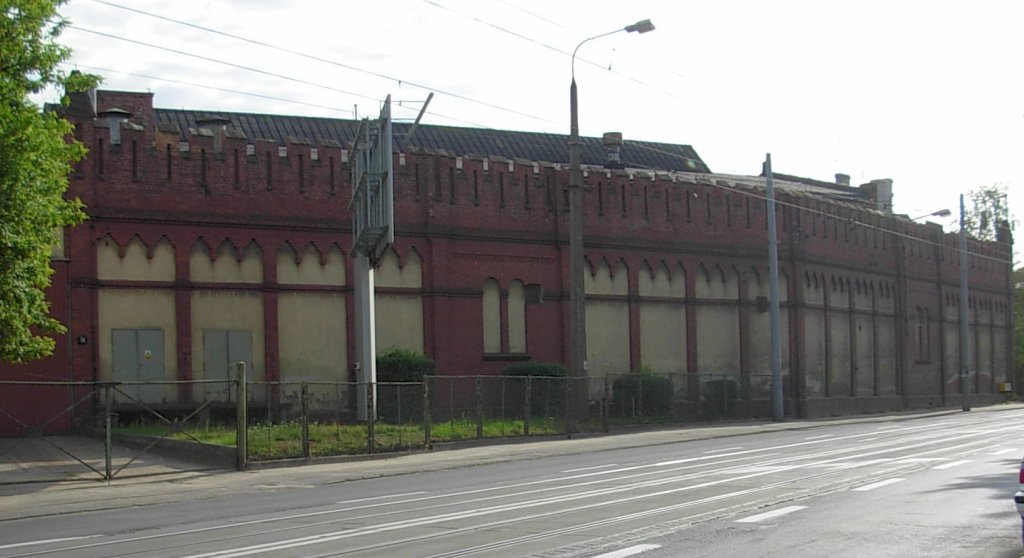
View on the assembly hall from Nakielska street

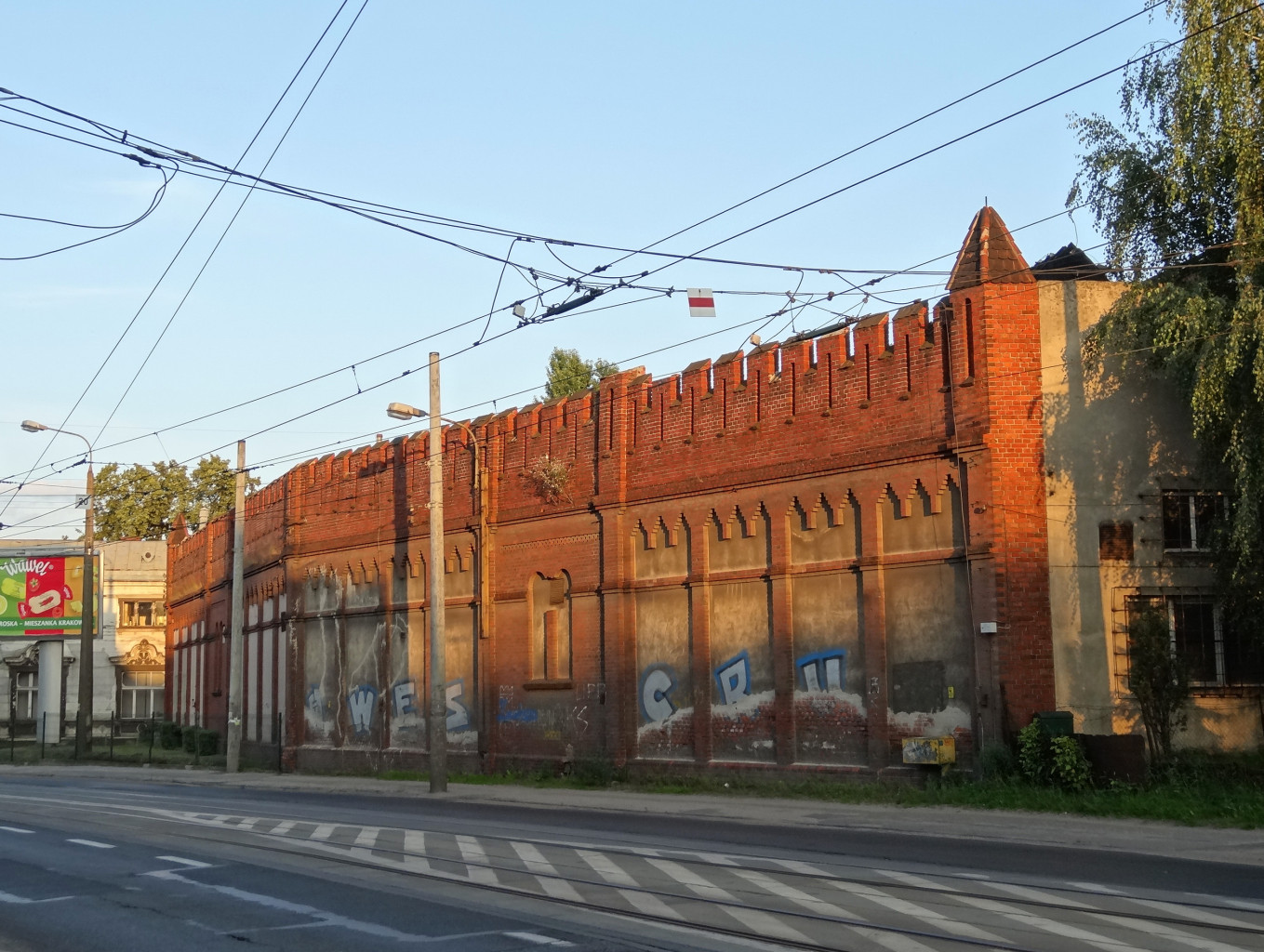
View from Nakielska street

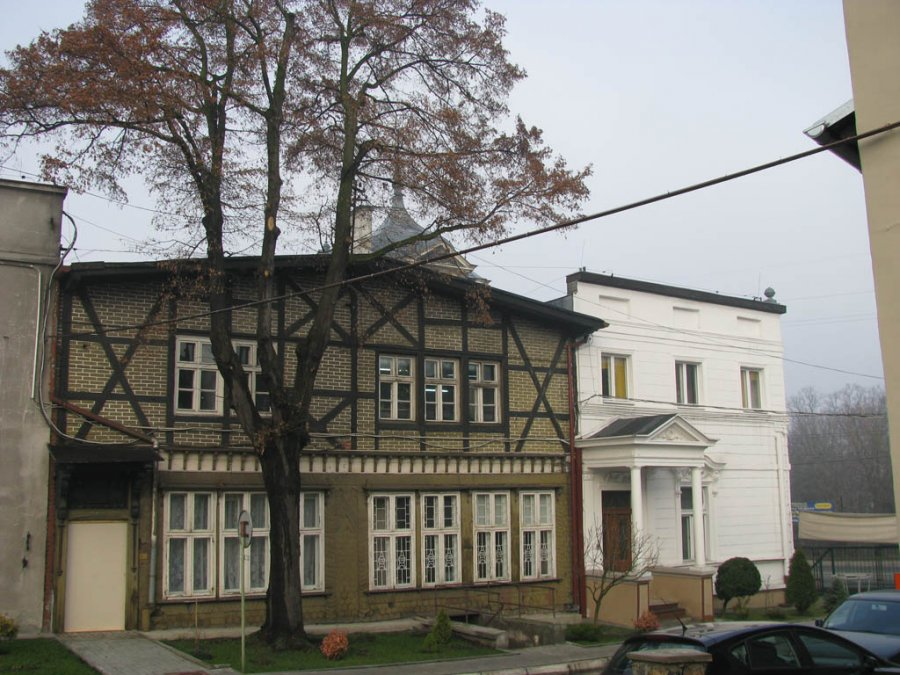
View on the main gate, the lathe ward and part of "Carl Blumwe" Villa

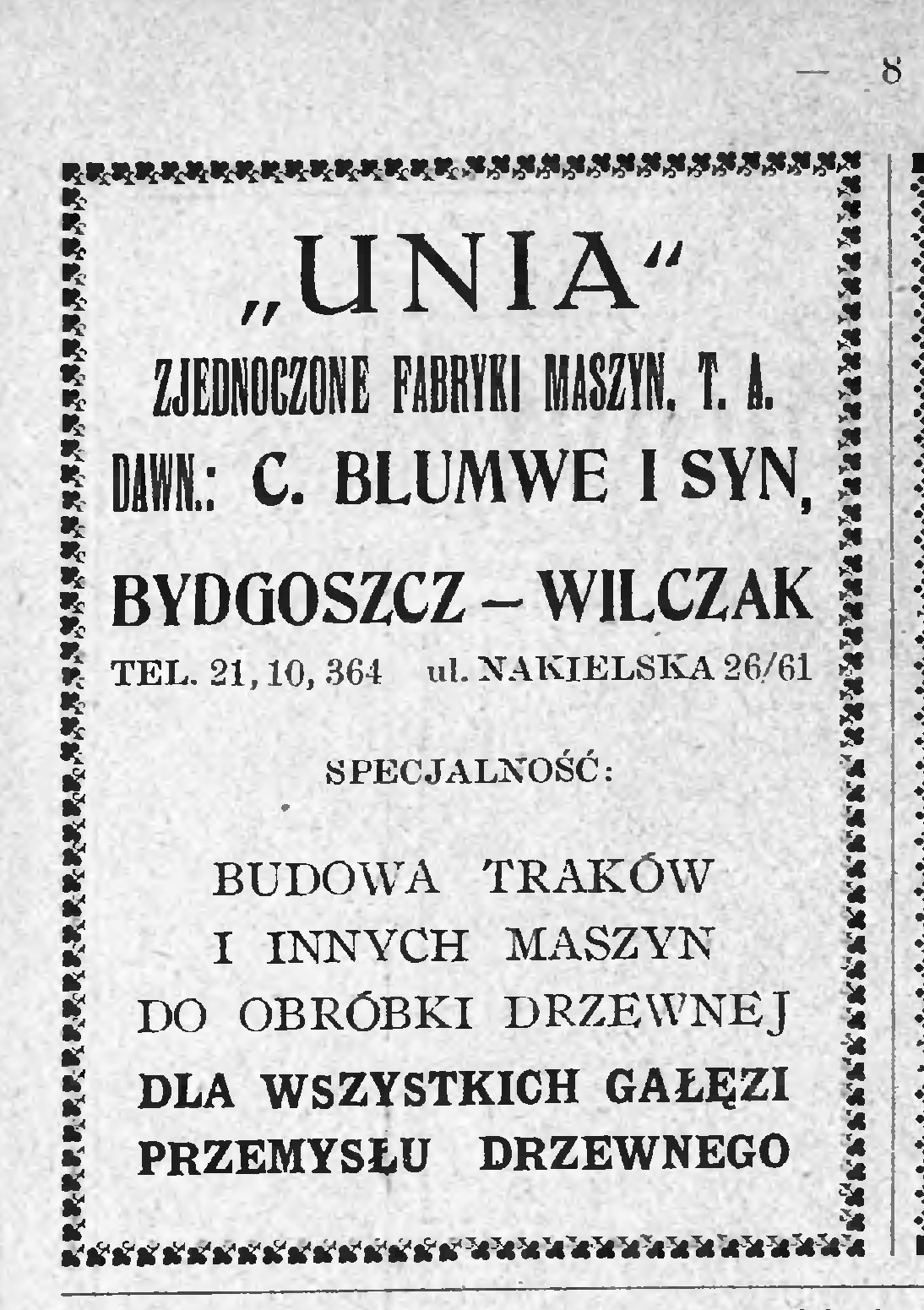
Advertising for Blumwe Company in 1925

== Blumwe's kinderheim ==
The villa has been erected at the end of the 19th century by eminent Bydgoszcz architect Fritz Weidner. Fritz Weidner, at the time, had already realized many edifices downtown: in Gdańska Street (28,79, 91, 119), August Cieszkowski Street (22), Dworcowa Street (71).

Initial address was Nakelerstraße 21. In 1900, Wilhelm Blumwe established in this house a home care for his employees' children (German: kinderheime): there had been residing an average of 120 children daily, under the tutelage of two deaconess sisters. In 1902, the villa housed in addition a center for deaconesses as nurses's training center. In the 1920s, after the re-establishment of the Polish state, the edifice was donated as a house for Deaconesses (Polish: Dom Diakonisek).

Today, the villa is a property of the Polish Health Care System and welcomes a local dispensary.

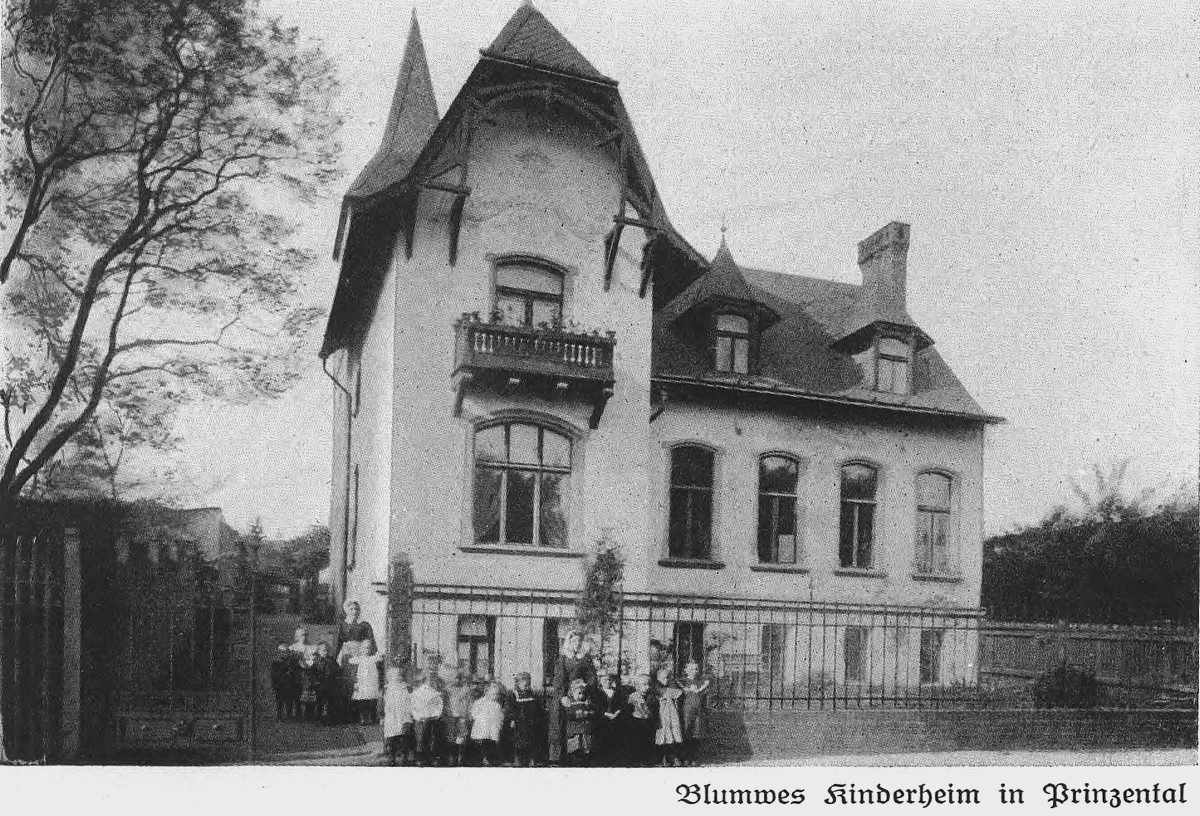
The Villa in 1911

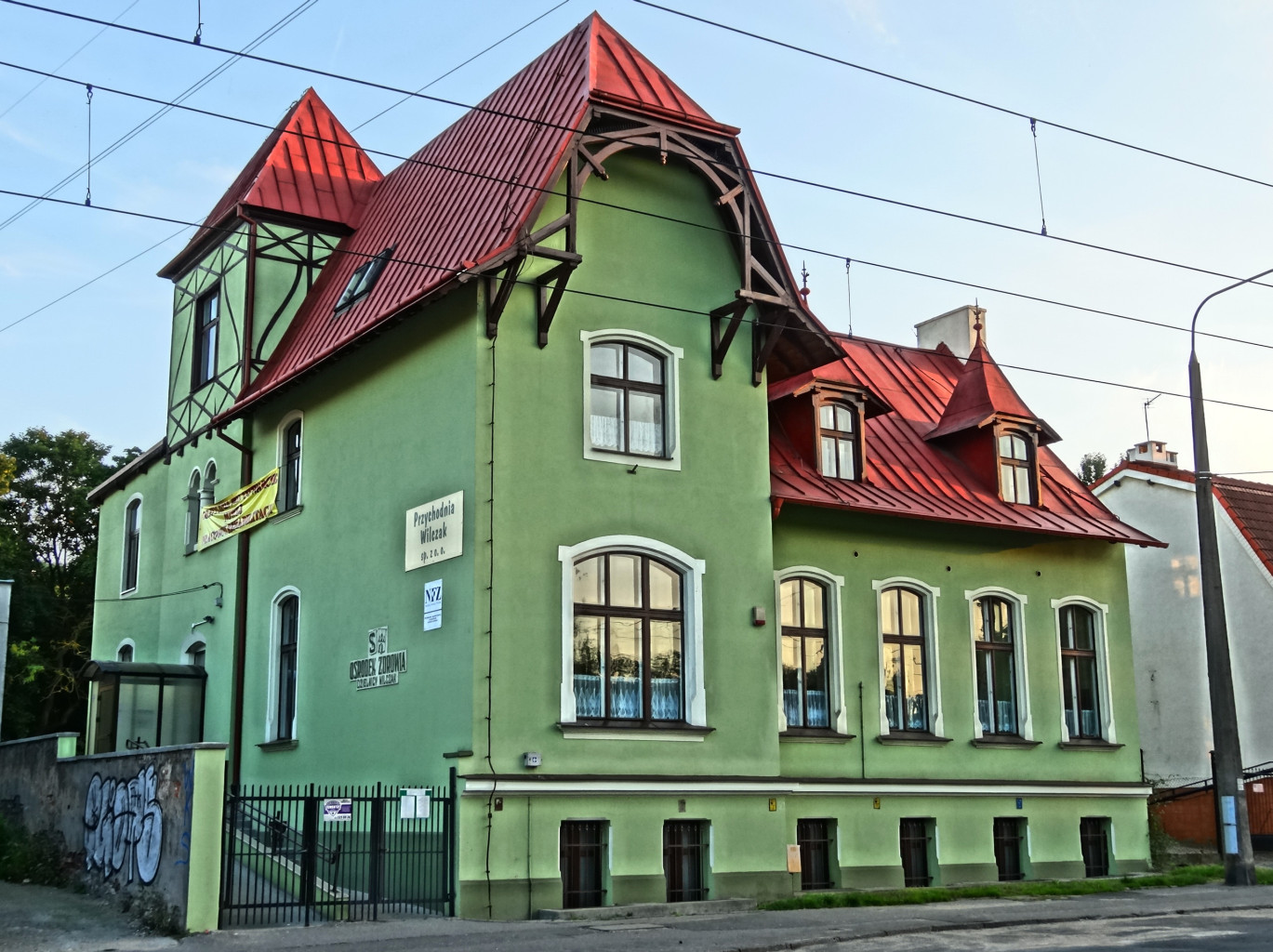
View from Nakielska Street

== Bibliography ==
- Brzozowska Iwona, Derkowska-Kostkowska Bogna (1997). Fabryka Carla i Wilhelma Blumwe na bydgoskim Wilczaku. Materiały do dziejów kultury i sztuki Bydgoszczy i regionu. Zeszyt 2 (in Polish). Bydgoszcz: Pracownia dokumentacji i popularyzacji zabytków wojewódzkiego ośrodka kultury w Bydgoszczy. pp. 71–82.
- Wysocka, Agnieszka (1997). Willa Blumwego. Materiały do dziejów kultury i sztuki Bydgoszczy i regionu. Zeszyt 2 (in Polish). Bydgoszcz: Pracownia dokumentacji i popularyzacji zabytków wojewódzkiego ośrodka kultury w Bydgoszczy. pp. 67–70.
- Błażejewski Stanisław, Kutta Janusz, Romaniuk Marek (1996). Bydgoski Słownik Biograficzny. Tom III (in Polish). Bydgoszcz: Kujawsko-Pomorskie Towarzystwo Kulturalne Wojewódzki Ośrodek Kultury. ISBN 8385327320.
