= Gdańsk Street 22, Bydgoszcz =

Tenement at 22 Gdańska street, Bydgoszcz
- Polish: Kamienica Gdańska 22 w Bydgoszczy
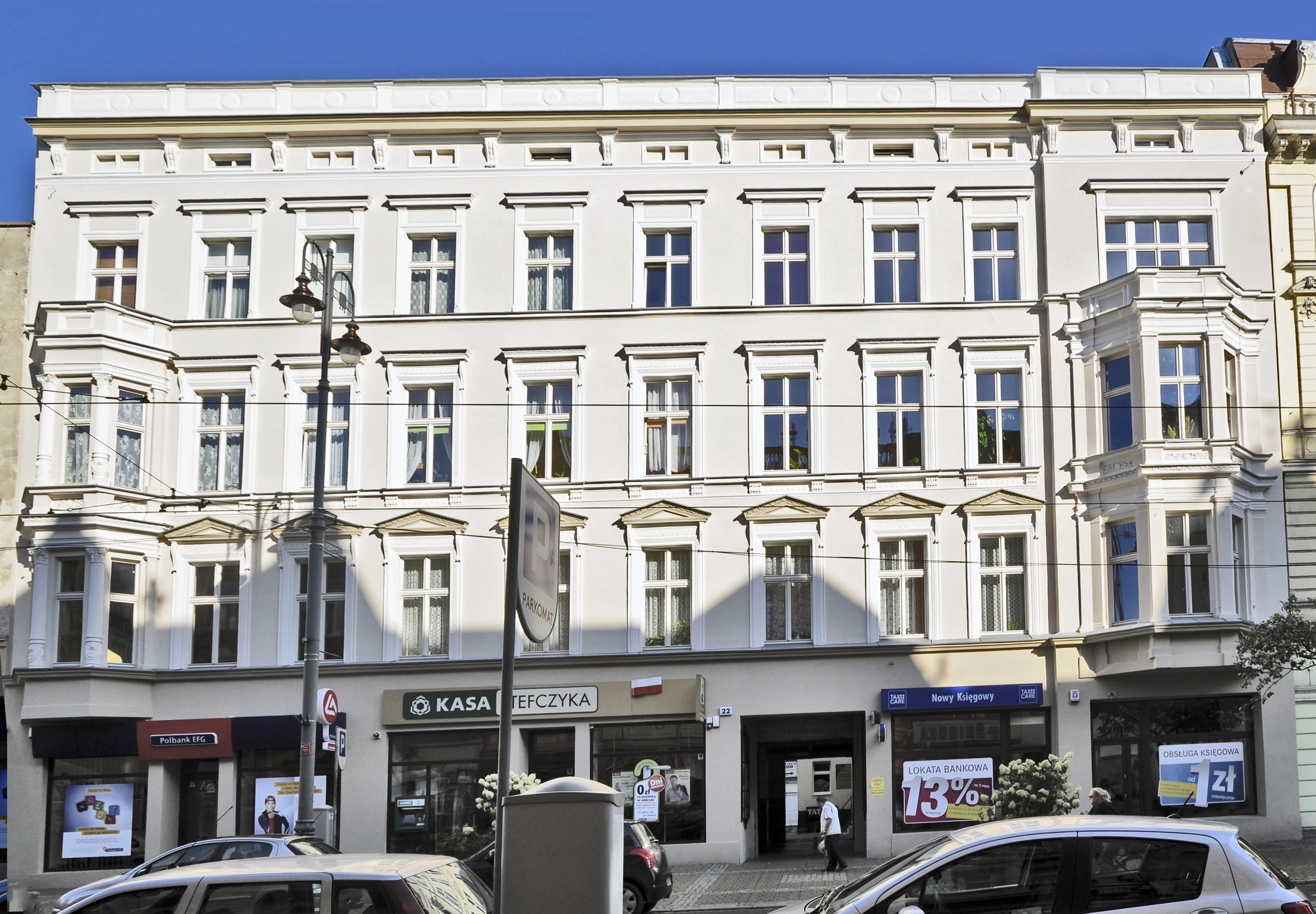
- View from Gdańska street
- Interactive map of the Tenement at 22 Gdańska street, Bydgoszcz area

General information
- Type: Tenement
- Architectural style: Eclecticism
- Classification: Nr.601298-Reg.A/987, 28 May 1991
- Location: 22 Gdańska street, Bydgoszcz, Poland, Poland
- Coordinates: 53°7′39″N 18°0′19″E
- Construction started: 1850
- Completed: 1875
- Renovated: 1883, 1910-1911

Technical details
- Floor count: 4

Design and construction
- Architects: Carl Stampehl (1883), Rudolf Kern (1910-1911)

The tenement at 22 Gdańska street is a tenement located in downtown Bydgoszcz.

== Location ==
The building stands on the eastern side of Gdańska street and is adjacent to the neo-baroque tenement at 1 Freedom Square, from architect Józef Święcicki.

== History ==
Initially located at 159 Danziger Straße, the first registered landlord was a wood merchant, ßulvermacher Samuel, in the early 1870s. He lived there till 1910.

Afterwards, the ownership moved to Georg Aronsohn, a member of the Judicial Council (German: Justizrat), lawyer and notar.

After the end of World War II, the tenement housed the State Pedagogical Secondary School for a year, before moving back to 3 Seminaryjna Street on September 1, 1946.

== Architecture ==
From first floors upwards, the style is connected to eclecticism, dating back to the 3rd quarter of the 19th century. The original project aimed to put the atlantes to support portals and a richly adorned attic. Eventually, the result has been limited to a modest decoration in the style of classicism.

In 1883, the building was raised to its current size: it has been designed by architect Carl Stampehl who introduced the three-sided bay windows. Carl Stampehl, at that times, had already realized few other buildings, especially in Długa street (12, 24, 32, 34, 35, 46). A few years later, Carl Stampehl will work on the conception of the Villa Carl Blumwe on Nakielska street.

In the 1910–1911, a number of modernization were carried out: new storefronts and rearranged interior layout, designed by the architect Rudolf Kern. The same architect, one year earlier (1909), supervised the overhaul of the tenement at 5 Gdańska street

In the 1930s, the building housed the pastry and coffee shop "Italia" owned by Henry Kocięcki, and during communist period a restaurant, "Rybna" ("Fish").

The building has been put on the Pomeranian heritage list (Nr.601298-Reg.A/987) on the 28 May 1991.

== Gallery ==
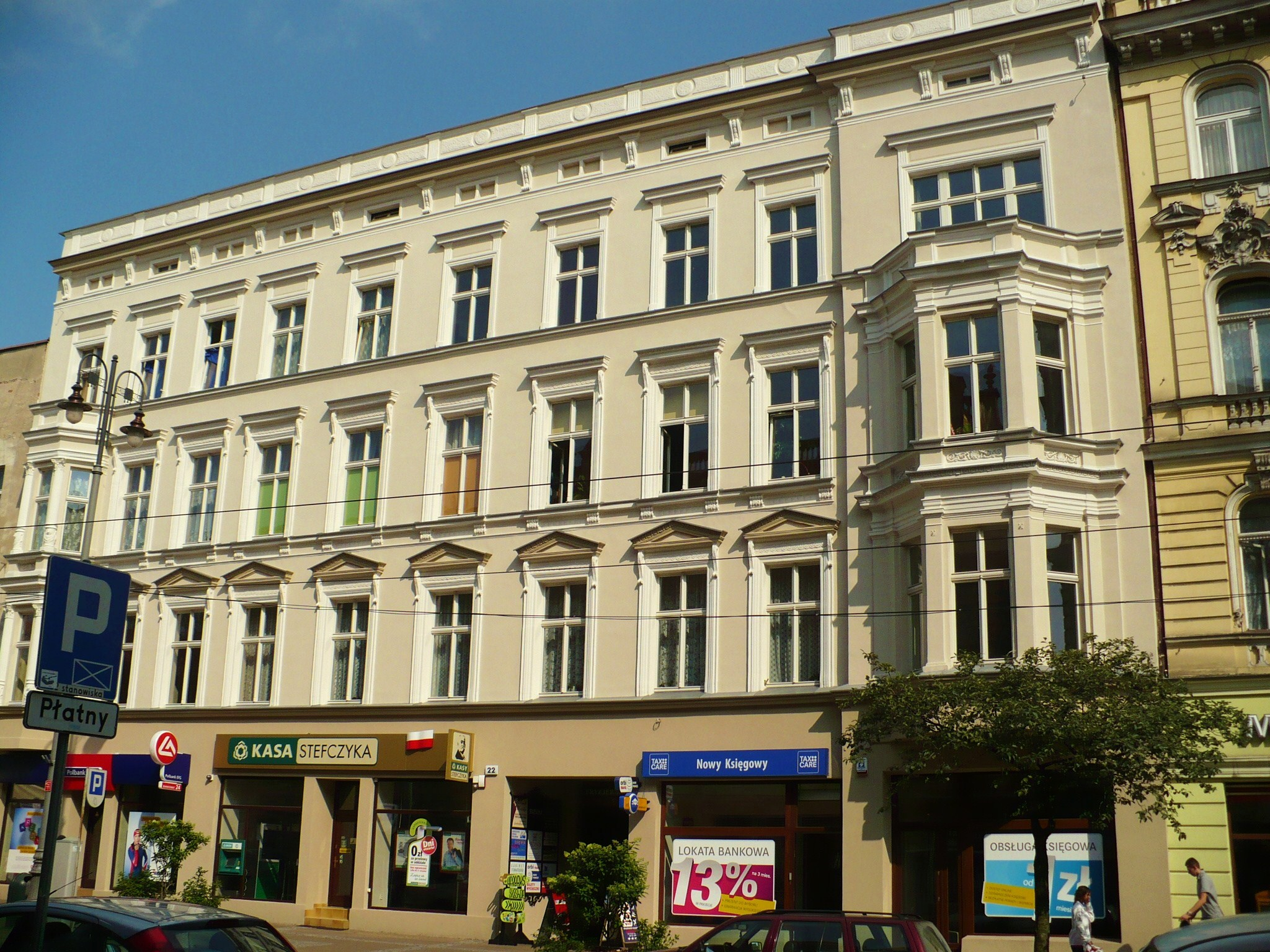
View northward

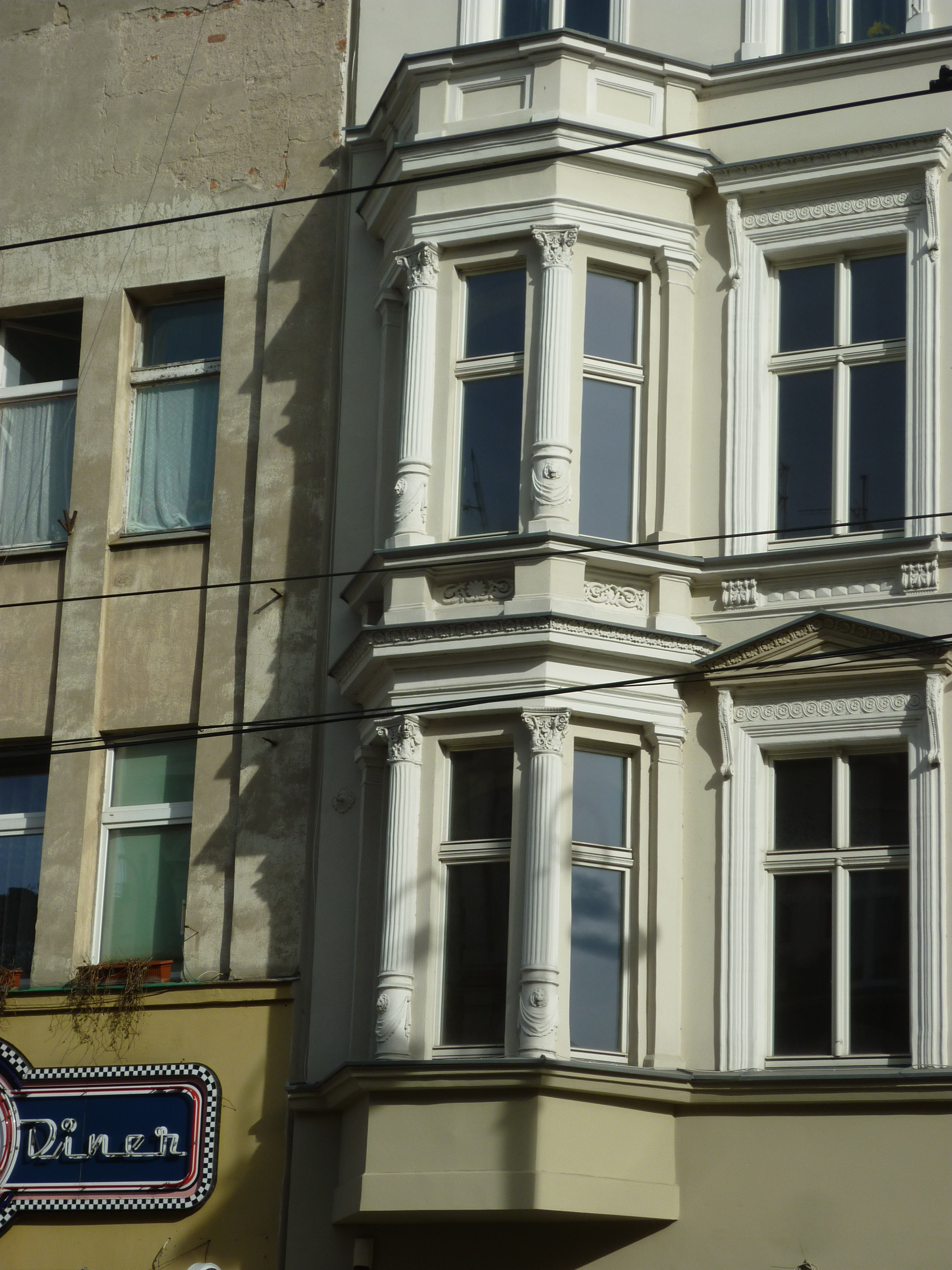
Bay window detail

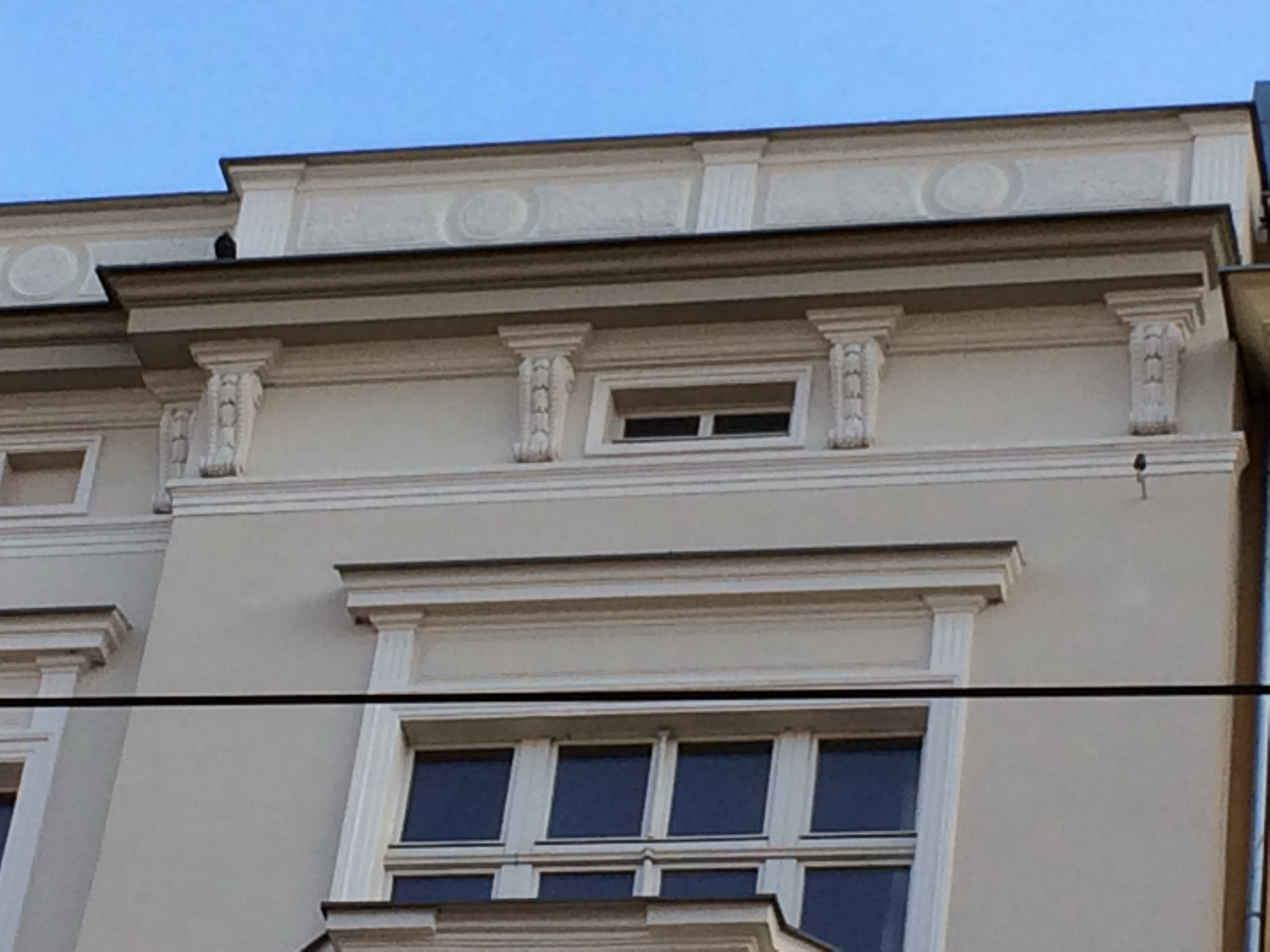
Detail of corbels on top
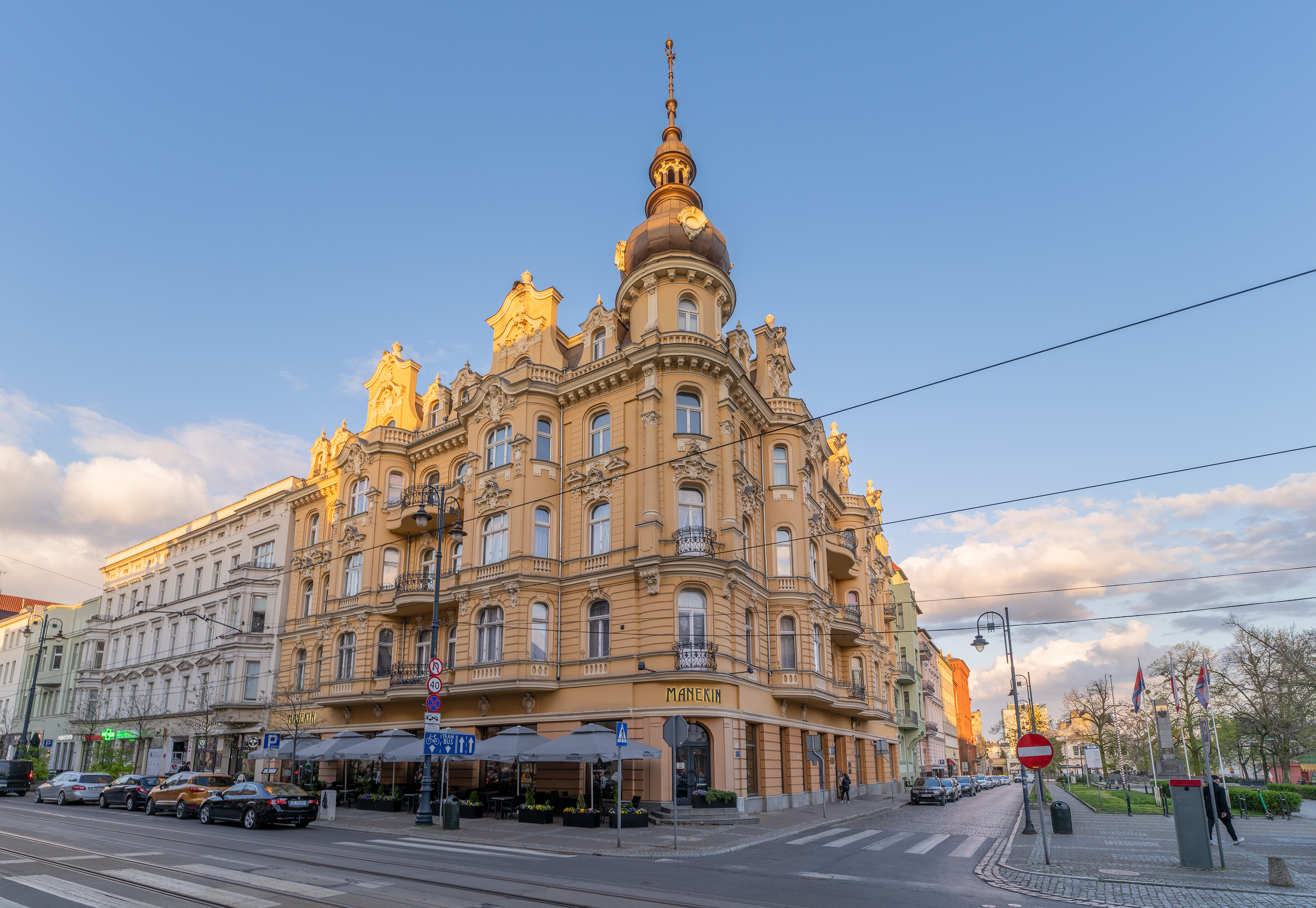
Panorama with the tenement on the left of the corner building

== See also ==
- Bydgoszcz
- Gdanska Street in Bydgoszcz
- Carl Stampehl
- Rudolf Kern
- (in Polish) Downtown district in Bydgoszcz

== Bibliography ==
- (in Polish) Bręczewska-Kulesza Daria, Derkowska-Kostkowska Bogna, Wysocka A. (2003). Ulica Gdańska. Przewodnik historyczny. Bydgoszcz: Wojewódzki Ośrodek Kultury w Bydgoszczy. ISBN 9788386970100.
