= MAKRUM =

Company, Bydgoszcz, Poland, 19th century

Coordinates: 53°07′15.15″N 18°00′12.66″E

- Type: Private
- Industry: Machine industry
- Predecessor: Hermann Löhnert Aktiengesellschaft, Pomorska Fabryka Maszyn Sp. z o. o.
- Founded: 1868
- Founder: Hermann Löhnert
- Headquarters: 11/19 Leśna Street, Bydgoszcz, Poland
- Products: Mills, dryers, road construction machines
- Owner: IMMOBILE S.A. Capital Group
- Parent: Projprzem Makrum S.A. Industrial Group
- Website: http://www.makrum.pl/en/

Makrum is a firm in Bydgoszcz established in 1868, by Hermann Löhnert and manufacturing heavy industrial devices.

Since 2014, it is owned by the corporate group "Immobile S.A.". Currently, the "MAKRUM" brand operates under the name Projprzem Makrum S.A. Industrial Group (Polish: Grupa Przemysłowa Projprzem Makrum S.A). Its seat is located in Bydgoszcz, at 3 Kościelecki Square.

== History ==
=== Prussian period ===
Hermann Löhnert was born on July 3, 1845. In the 1860s, he moved from Wrocław to Bydgoszcz (then Bromberg), where in 1868, he set up an agricultural machinery shop and a workshop, also providing mechanical threshing services.

In 1870, he purchased a plot on Gamm Straße (today's Warmińskiego street), to build a flat and an office for his company of agriculture machines (German: landwirtschaft machinen); he added in 1876, a machine repair workshop. Initially, it employed 20 people.

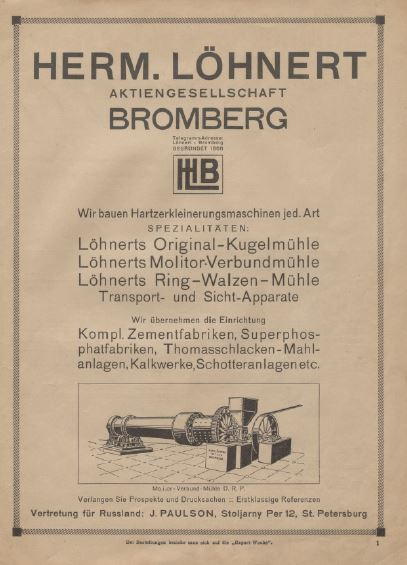
Advert for Löhnert's factory, 1913

Löhnert patented a new thresher for clover, a real bestseller: he sold about 4000 units by 1897. In 1888, he built a new factory at then Bahnhoffstraße 6 (present day 17 Dworcowa Street), where he started the production of:

- ball mills for crushing lime and ore;
- fertilisers;
- machines for sugar factories and distilleries;
- cement kilns, manufactured from 1895 and based on an improved prototype by master bricklayer Waldemar Jenisch. This kiln gained a worldwide reputation, meeting the widespread demand of the cement industry.

At the end of the 19th century, Löhnert's factory employed 240 workers, all were covered by a social security system and regularly received firm savings from the owner. In 1899, the firm became a Joint-stock company with the participation of the Ostbank für Handel und Gewerbe (English: East bank for trade and commerce) from Poznań and changed its name to Bromberger Maschinenfabrik H. Löhnert AG, Bromberg (English: Bydgoszcz machine factory H. Löhnert AG). Hermann Löhnert was the chairman of the management board. The "Maschinenfabrik H. Löhnert" was exporting to Italy, Austria, Switzerland, United Kingdom, the Russian Empire and even to China or South America. This was the first factory in the history of the city present on several continents.

At the beginning of the 20th century, he purchased land on the eastern outskirts of then Bromberg (today's Leśna street), envisioning to further expand the downtown plant. As such from 1902 to 1912, several facilities were built: (e.g. administrative buildings, an assembly hall, a foundry for casting iron, a 800 kilowatts (1,100 hp) steam engined power plant). A dedicated rail siding was specifically laid down to join the premises with the rail line Warsaw-Bydgoszcz. This facility operated until 2012 as the main production line of the firm Makrum.

Hermann Löhnert died on August 26, 1910, in Bydgoszcz. In 1913, manpower reached 800 workers. During World War I, the factory carried out production for the German army.

=== Interwar period ===
Poland regained its independence in 1920, which caused the departure of most of the technical staff (composed of 90% Germans). Despite these conditions, the company kept the production running. The manpower reached 540 people.

In the interwar period, the firm now called Pomorska Fabryka Maszyn Sp. z o. o. had a German-Polish capital and was selling, before the Great Depression, most of its products to Bydgoszcz mechanical engineering companies. In the 1920s, the panel of products was expanded to include machines and equipment for boilers, rollers, lifts, cranes and construction and road machinery. At its heyday, the company was the second largest industrial plant in Bydgoszcz. Steam boilers and iron structures were exported to Yugoslavia and Belgium.

During the Great Depression (1929-1935), the factory reduced its operations to a minimum: only 21 employees remained. In April 1932, the factory filed bankruptcy and kept this status until the end of 1938, when business slowly improved. In 1939, the plant started manufacturing machines for crushing hard materials, narrow-gauge railway rolling stock and equipment for cement and sugar plants or for brickworks. In August 1939, 103 people were working in the firm.

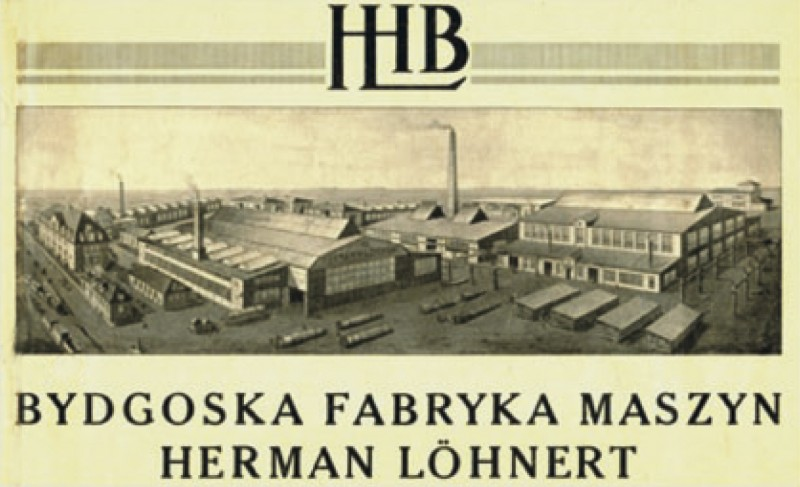
Hermann Löhnert's Factory in the 1930s

=== German occupation ===
During the German occupation, the factory took the name Hermann Löhnert's Bydgoska Fabryka Maszyn and worked for the German war effort, producing, inter alia, parts for submarines or elevators, anchors, cast iron elements and shrapnel shells.

=== Polish People's Republic (1947-1989) ===
In 1946, the society was nationalized. The almost-1000 worforce was divided between 4 locations in Bydgoszcz:

- ca. 700 employees at 19 Leśna street;
- 139 people at 11 Swiętej Trojcy street;
- 76 people at 112 Gdańska street;
- 42 people at 102 Fordońska street.

The manpower rose to 1200 people in 1954, including 200 women.

In the 1950s, the factory at Leśna street was dramatically expanded (mechanical processing areas, assembly and casting iron halls). In 1957, the firm merged with the nationalized "Hans Eberhardt's Factory" (at Swiętej Trojcy street) and its name was changed to Pomorskie Zakłady Budowy Maszyn "Makrum" (Polish: Pomeranian Machine Building Plant) with several departments.

Another wave of expansion occurred from 1962 to 1967, further rebuilding factory halls and retrofitting the processing machines to handle heavy, large-size devices. In the 1970s, automation was introduced in the production lines. However, the compulsory use of domestic components, raw materials and appliances reduced significantly the quality of manufactured products which regularly demonstrated defects.

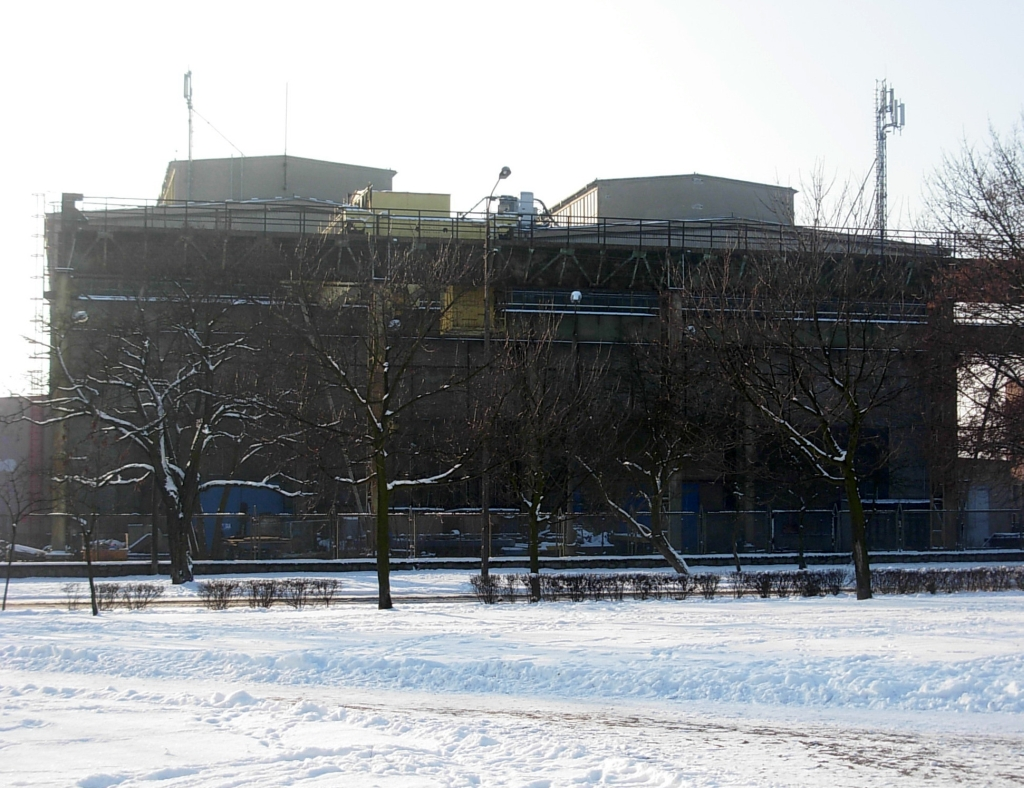
Former Makrum production hall in Leśne district

In the 1960s and the 1970s, the company was an important manufacturer of machinery and equipment for the building material industry in Europe. From 1975 onwards, the plant had its own design department, which prepared the full technical documentation to be sent to the different subcontracting facilities:

- Nowiny (aluminium and cement processing);
- Piechcin, Groszowice, Małogoszcz, Tarnobrzeg, Sulejów, Szczakowa and Goleszów (cement processing).

At that time, "MAKRUM" belonged to the Union of Mechanized Construction "Zremb" based in Warsaw. The Bydgoszcz-based plant carried out exports to countries of the Comecon, Libya, Pakistan, Kuwait, North Korea and China. Occasionally, some orders were performed for customers from Western countries. In the 1960s, with the set up of a "Department of Heavy Constructions", barges and ships were regularly used to transport large-size machinery and equipment.

In the 1980s, "MAKRUM" was exporting about 30% of its production. Under an export agreement, plants were built abroad:

- in Iraq (a cement plant in Fallujah and a lime plant in Karbala);
- in Kuwait (cement mill);
- in Hungary (cement mill in Beremend).

In addition to these equipments in the Middle East, complete facilities with machinery were shipped to Bulgaria, Czechoslovakia and Soviet Union.

As the premises at Leśna street (in the Leśne district) reached their maximum extension, it was decided in the early 1980s to construct a new production complex in Paterek near Nakło nad Notecią, three times larger than in Bydgoszcz. Unfortunately, the economic crisis in 1980-1981 ground to a halt the project and the unfinished plant was handed over to the Polish State Railways in 1983.

=== Third Polish Republic (since 1989) ===
In 1991, under the "Common Privatization Program" (Polish: Program Powszechnej Prywatyzacji), "MAKRUM" was transformed into a Joint-stock company.

In 2001, Rafał Jerzy became the main shareholder of the firm and steered "MAKRUM" towards offshore and marine industry sectors. In 2007, the company entered the Warsaw Stock Exchange and a year later, it took over the Szczecin-based "Stocznia Pomerania" (English: Pomeranian Shipyard).

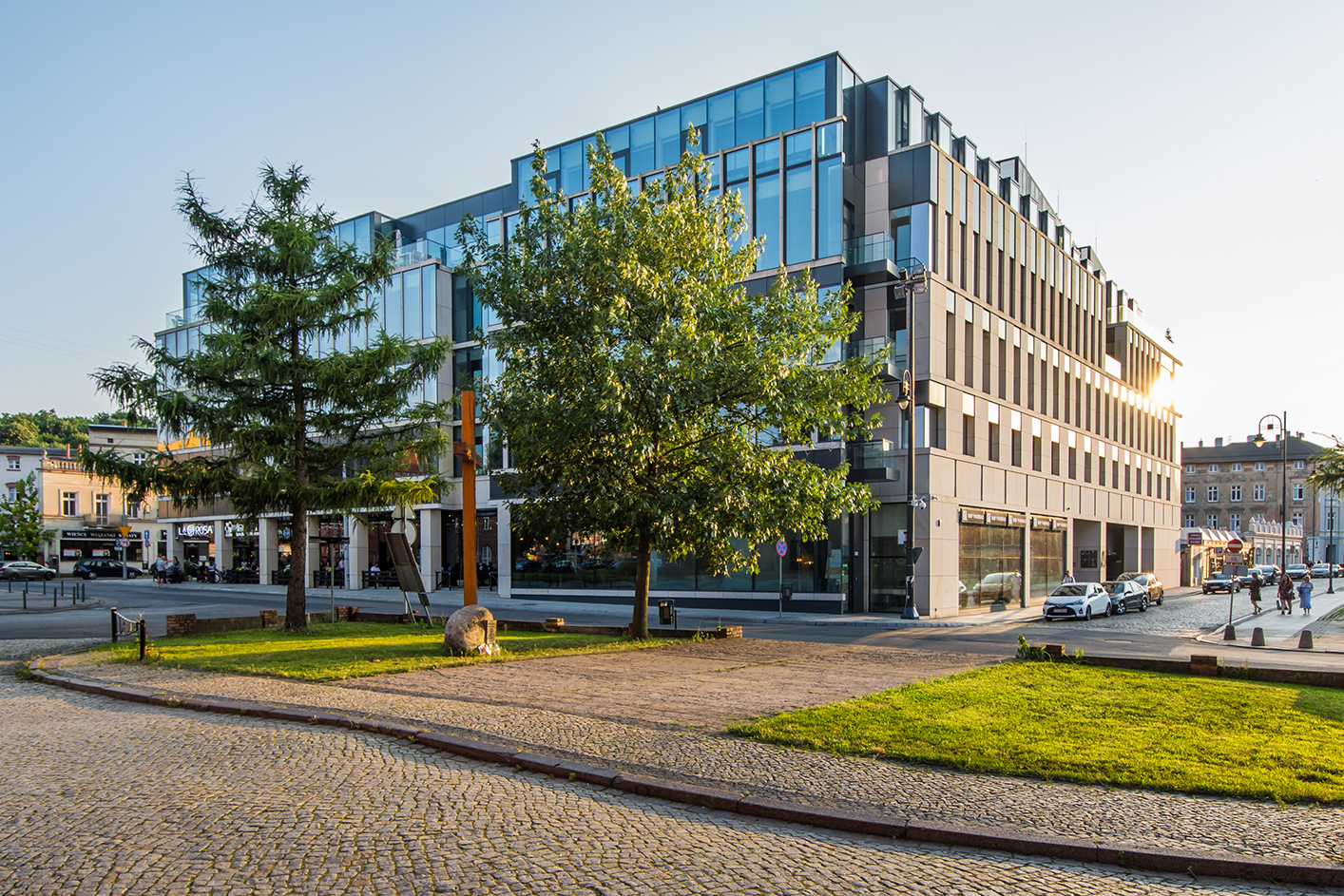
Seat of Immobile Capital Group on Kościelecki Square, Bydgoszcz

In 2011, Immobile Capital Group was established as a conglomerate managing companies from diverse market sectors such as "MAKRUM", "Focus Hotels", "Quiosque" (clothing shops) or "Atrem SA" (engineering technology). In 2012, "MAKRUM" production department (ca. 400 employees) was transferred to a 15 hectares (37 acres)-leased area in Paterek. In 2014, the conglomerate's, which named was changed to "Immobile Capital Group S.A.", operated in diverse economic areas: electromechanical industry, hotels, construction, trade and property management.

In 2015, the factory in the "Leśne district" (ex-Leśna street) was entirely relocated to a 2 hectares (4.9 acres) section of the "Bydgoszcz Industrial and Technological Park" (Polish: Bydgoski Park Przemysłowo-Technologiczny) in the south of the city. The plot of the former plant, located between streets Leśna, Kamienna, Dwernickiego and Sułkowskiego, and covering 10 hectares (25 acres), was first considered to be converted into a shopping center.

Eventually, the place is being transformed (in 2022) into an office and residential estate, Platanowy Park, the largest multifunctional housing estate in the city. Once completed, the project will comprise a dozen buildings with over 1,000 apartments: the first works started on May 29, 2014. The entire project is run by "CDI", a subsidiary of Immobile Capital Group S.A.

On September 25, 2019, the demolition of the remaining production buildings on the parcel began. It has been completed by the end of June 2020. Two large industrial presses are planned to stay on the site, as a memorial to the 150 years of presence of the factory.

== Characteristics ==
Nowadays, "MAKRUM" is a recognized producer of machinery and equipment for the mining, chemical and cement industry. Its core production encompasses the following items:

- industrial crushers;
- feeders;
- screening machines;
- rotary drum driers
- ball mills.

The company developed an innovative machine for road construction, the "Reclaimed Asphalt Granulator". Furthermore, specific orders for large-size steel constructions are carried out towards sectors like mining, shipbuilding and machine industry. Finally, "MAKRUM" provides services such as mechanical and plastic working, machine repairing, welding, or steel elements cleaning/painting.

Its recent customers include, inter alia, Rolls-Royce Motor Cars, Helmerding (hydraulic presses), KGHM Polska Miedź (copper and silver producer) and AXTech (marine industry).

== See also ==
- Bydgoszcz

== Bibliography ==
- (in Polish) Umiński, Janusz (2014). Fabryka, jakich niewiele. Kalendarz Bydgoski. Bydgoszcz: Towarzystwo Miłośników Miasta Bydgoszczy. pp. 33–35.
