= Saint Andrew Bobola's Church, Bydgoszcz =

Catholic Church, Bydgoszcz, Poland, Early 20th century

Coordinates: 53°07′15″N 18°00′16″E

Saint Andrew Bobola's Church
- Kościół św. Andrzeja Boboli
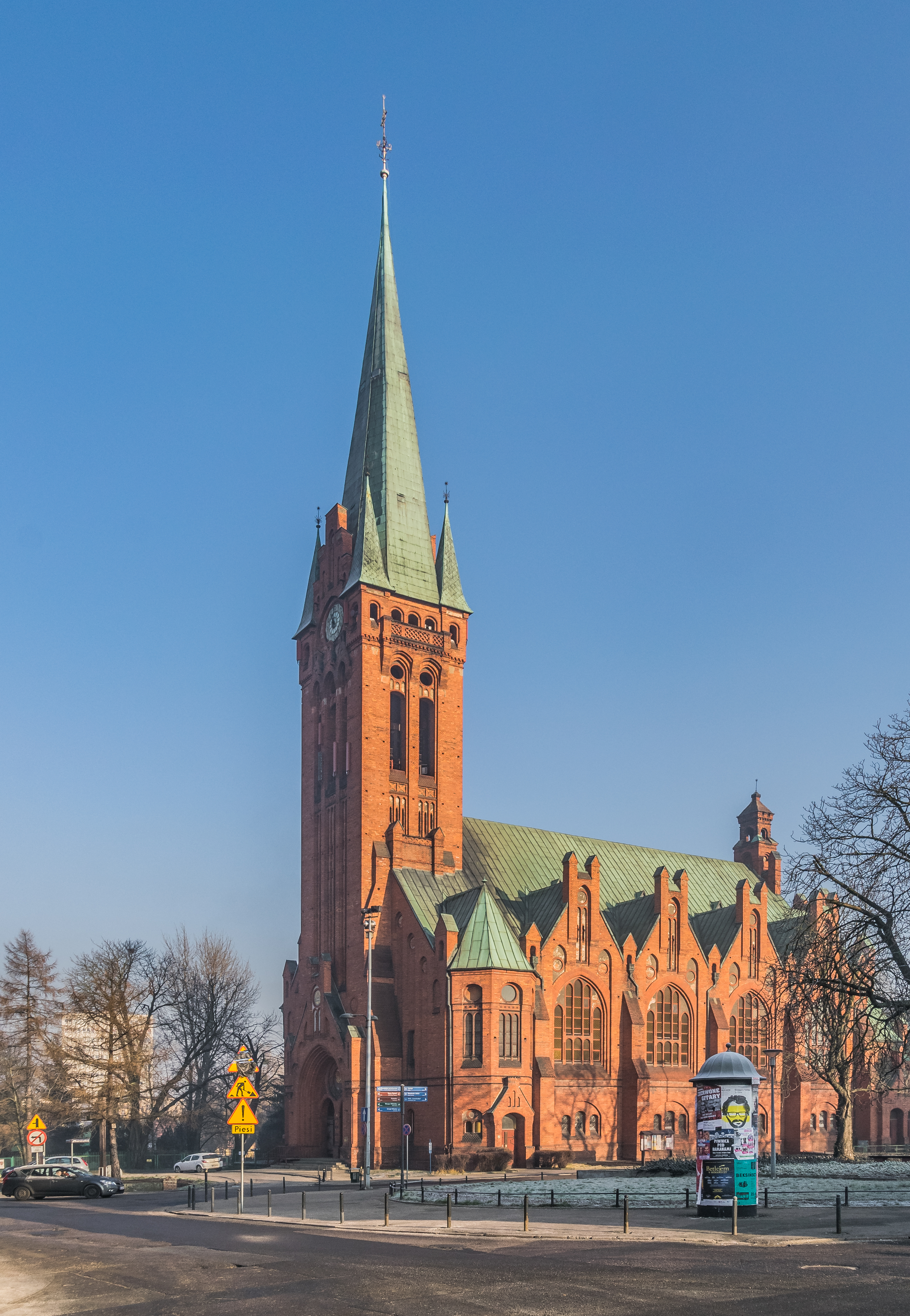
- Saint Andrew Bobola's Church from Kościelecki Square
- Saint Andrew Bobola's Church
- Location: 7 Kościelecki Square, Bydgoszcz
- Country: Poland
- Denomination: Roman Catholic Church
- Website: siec.jezuici.pl/dziela/bydgoszcz/

History
- Dedication: St. Andrew Bobola

Architecture
- Heritage designation: Nr.601235, A/843 (December 15, 1998)
- Architect: Heinrich Seeling
- Architectural type: Neo-Gothic
- Style: Brick Gothic
- Groundbreaking: 1901
- Completed: 1903

Specifications
- Materials: Brick

Administration
- Diocese: Roman Catholic Diocese of Bydgoszcz

Saint Andrew Bobola's Church is a church in downtown Bydgoszcz, Poland. It is located on Kościelecki Square. Its patron saint is the Polish Jesuit Andrew Bobola. The edifice, completed in 1903, was designed by German architect Heinrich Seeling. It was registered on the Kuyavian-Pomeranian Voivodeship Heritage List on December 15, 1998.

== History ==
=== First temple ===
The first religious edifice on the site is associated with Bydgoszcz becoming part of the Prussian territory, as a result of the First Partition of Poland in 1772. One of the first decrees signed by Frederick the Great, following this event, on October 5, 1772, was the creation of an evangelical parish in Bromberg. At the time, very few Protestant German families lived there, but as a result of the colonization associated with the construction of the Bydgoszcz Canal and the establishment of a local garrison, things quickly changed. Catholics in 1815 accounted for only 40% of Bromberg population and only 25% from 1850 to 1920.

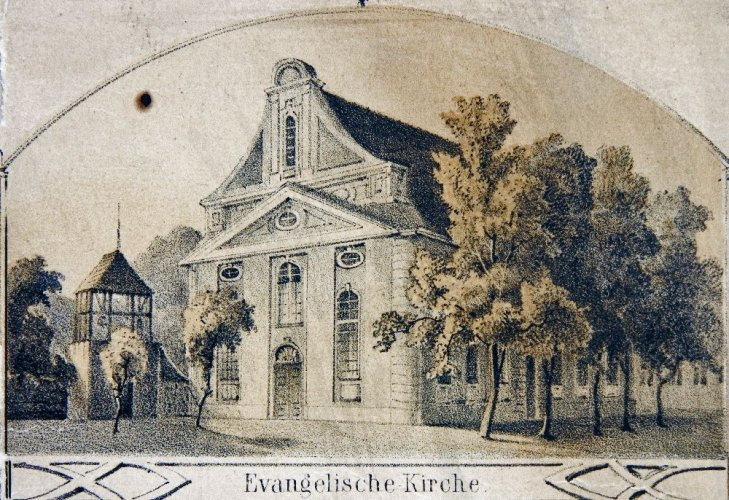
Bydgoszcz Old Evangelical temple, c. 1900

The first Lutheran service was celebrated on April 12, 1773. Until 1787, the Mass was performed in an attic room of the old town hall.

In 1784, a new church building was begun, thanks to funds from the Prussian state. The project was designed by architect Paul Johann Greth and completed in 1787, with consecration on January 21, 1787. Decoration and building continued, of the altar in 1788 and in 1794 of a wooden belfry carrying three bells, cast in Berlin the year before. Neglected, the church was closed in 1829, as it threatened to collapse. In 1833 and 1869, two heavy overhauls were performed, including extensions such as the rectory building from 1839 (today the seat of the Evangelical Parish in Bydgoszcz, at Waly Jagiellońskie street, 14).

After the second half of the 19th century, other churches began to appear, to meet the needs of the growing Protestant population, among others:

- St Peter's and St Paul's Church (1872-1878);
- Church of Divine Mercy, at 68 Nakielska Street;
- Church of the Savior (1897).

The old church was destroyed in 1903 to allow the creation of today's Teofila Magdzińskiego street. At the same spot now stands the city market hall at 4 Podwale Street, built in 1906. The bells from the belfry were moved to a church in nearby Osielsko.

=== Current building ===
The current church building was erected between 1901 and 1903, on the plot where once stood the city castle erected in 1346 by order of Casimir III the Great's, but falling apart at the end of the 19th century.

The author of the project was Berlin architect Heinrich Seeling, famous in Bydgoszcz for other realisations such as the Municipal Theatre, the Church of the Savior, and houses (tenement at 4 Jagiellońska Street and Villa Heinrich Dietz). The dedication of the unfinished edifice took place on October 22, 1903. On December 16, 1903, the finished church was dedicated.

In 1945, the church, occupied by communist authorities, was handed over to the Catholic community. In autumn 1946, the church, still damaged from World War II battles, returned to the ownership of the city and then entrusted to the religious order of the Jesuits. After an exhaustive reconstruction, the building was placed under the patronage of Polish Jesuit Andrew Bobola. Two Jesuits (the first ones to enter post-war Bydgoszcz) from Vilnius – Władysław Wantuchowski and Jan Kurdziel – installed at the main altar a copy of the icon Our Lady of the Gate of Dawn.

In 1967, St. Andrew Bobola Church became a parish. From 1977 on, the building became the first center in the city of the Catholic Intelligentsia Club (Polish: Klubu Inteligencji Katolickiej), following the Light-Life movement and the Catholic Charismatic Renewal, both a part of the renewal in the Catholic Church following Vatican II. In 1989, Trade Union "Solidarność" made the church a prominent activist centre of the Bydgoszcz region.

== Architecture ==
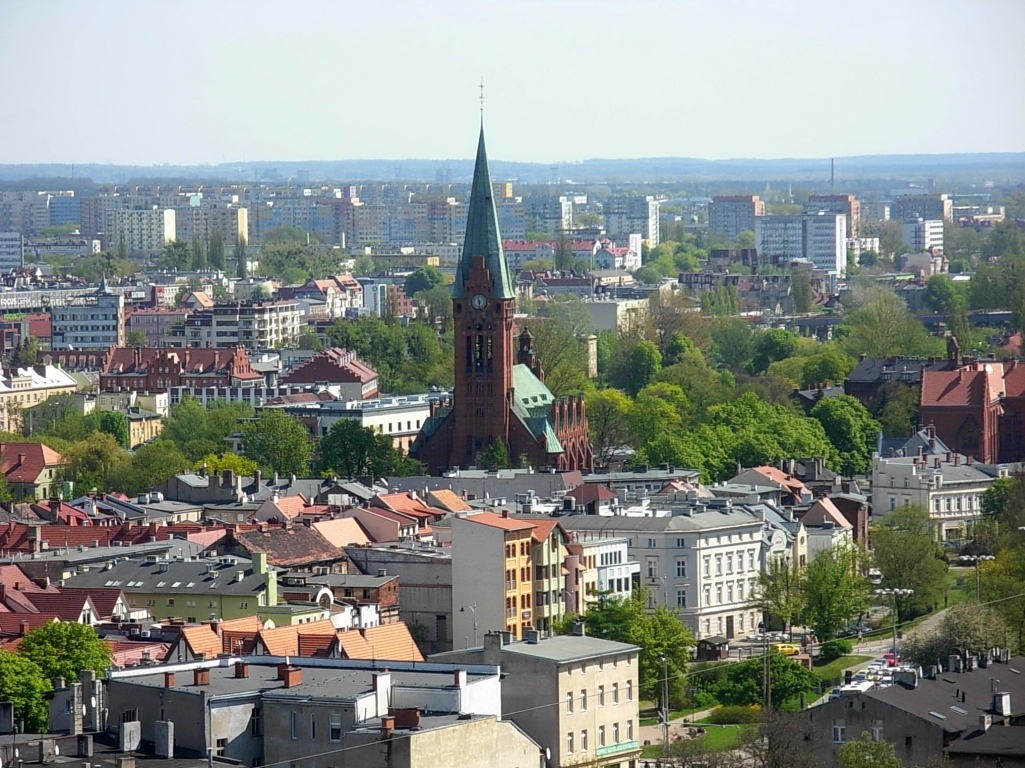
View from the heights of Bydgoszcz

=== Exteriors ===
The church has a Neo-Gothic style, distinctive of German Protestant churches at the beginning of the 20th century. To the north-eastern corner of the church stands an adorned chapel, dedicated to the Virgin Mary. On the western frontage, the high spire-topped tower rises above the neighborhood, with its turrets and finials. The main facade boasts a richly adorned portal, flanked by small triangular gables. The facades show various type of openings, with gables topped by pinnacles. Originally, the main entrance to the temple was flanked by a pair of stone statues of kneeling angels. In 1978 the tower was covered with copper sheet in place of ceramic tiles, and in 1996 the building received external lighting.

The spire is 75 m high, making the church the highest buildings in Bydgoszcz: the cross on the dome of St. Vincent de Paul Basilica stands at 65m, and the brand new residence Nordic Haven, in Grottgera street 4, is 55m high The tower clock mechanism was struck and damaged by lightning in July 2014.

=== Interiors ===
The interior is covered with diamond vault. To the east, the nave narrows to host the chancel. On both sides stands a gallery.

On the main altar in the chancel stands a large picture of St. Andrew Bobola, a copy of the painting in the Collegiate Church of Our Lady of Perpetual Help and St. Mary Magdalene in Poznań.

The church possesses a 42-voice pipe organ. It was initially a 48-voice instrument, one of the largest in the Voivodeship and the largest in Bydgoszcz. It was built in 1903 by the Wilhelm Sauer company, then overhauled and rebuilt by Josef Goebel from Gdańsk in 1940. Later repairs were carried out in 1947 by P. Sobiechowskiego Bydgoszcz company, and in 1998-1999 by Stanisław Broszko.

Since 2001, the Bydgoszcz Music Academy - "Feliks Nowowiejski" organizes in the church a festival of organ music, and since 2006 "Organ Evenings" sessions are held (40 concerts with 26 organists, singers, chorus and orchestras). It is now part of a broader International Summer concerts of organ and Chamber music (Polish: Letnie Międzynarodowe Koncerty Muzyki Organowej i Kameralnej), with monthly concerts every Tuesday from October to June.

== Gallery ==
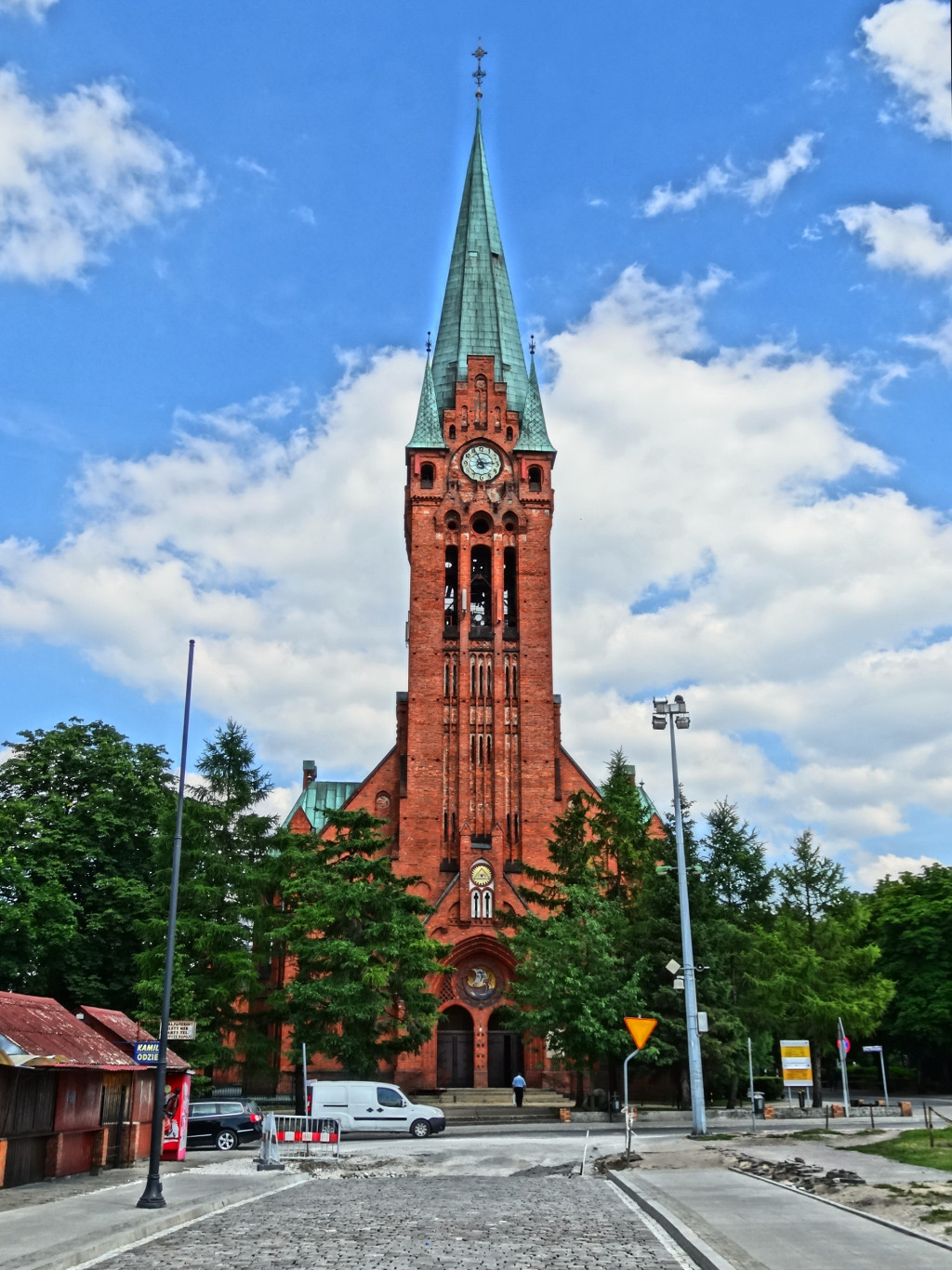
View from Magdzińskiego street

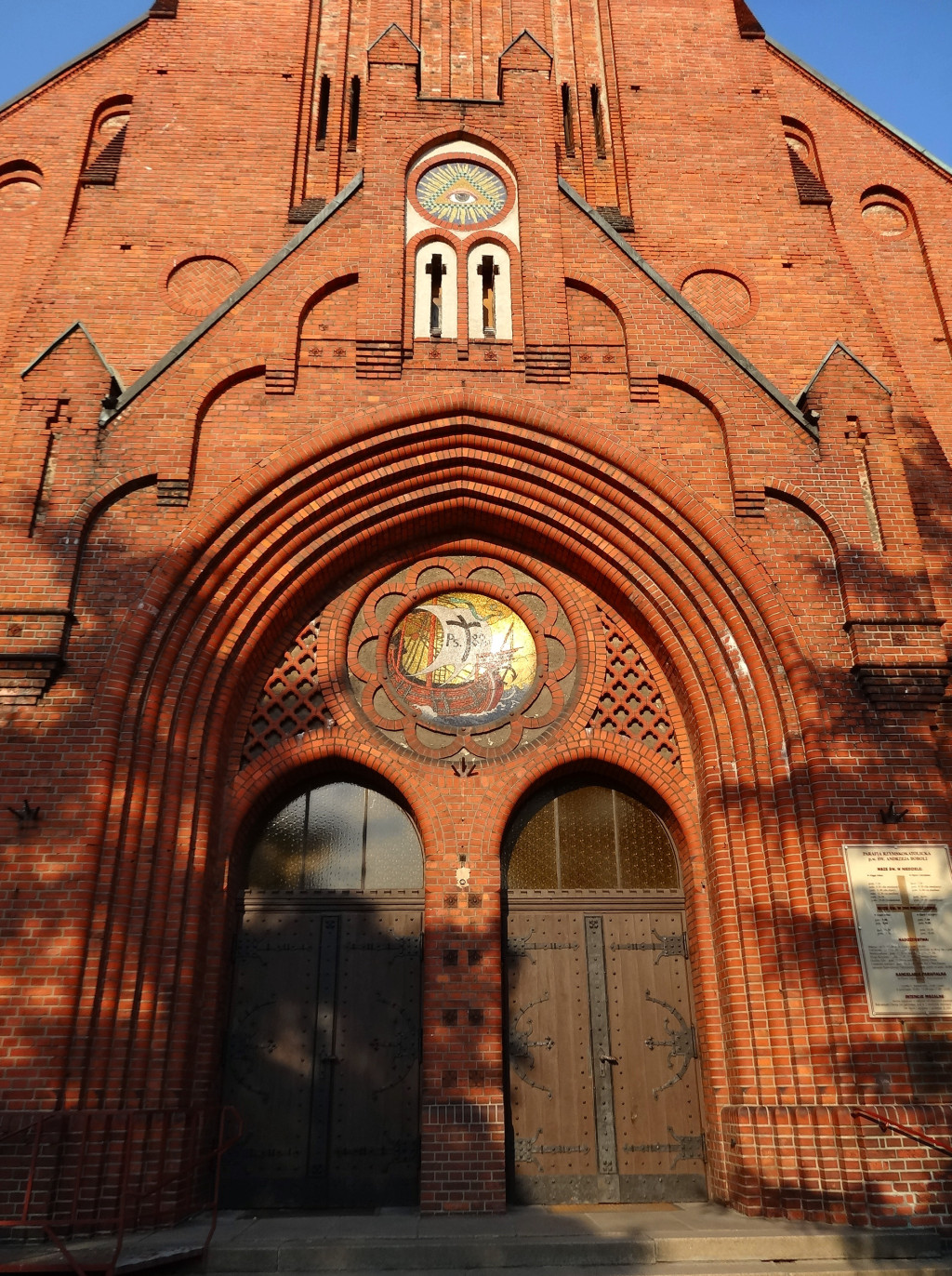
Main portal

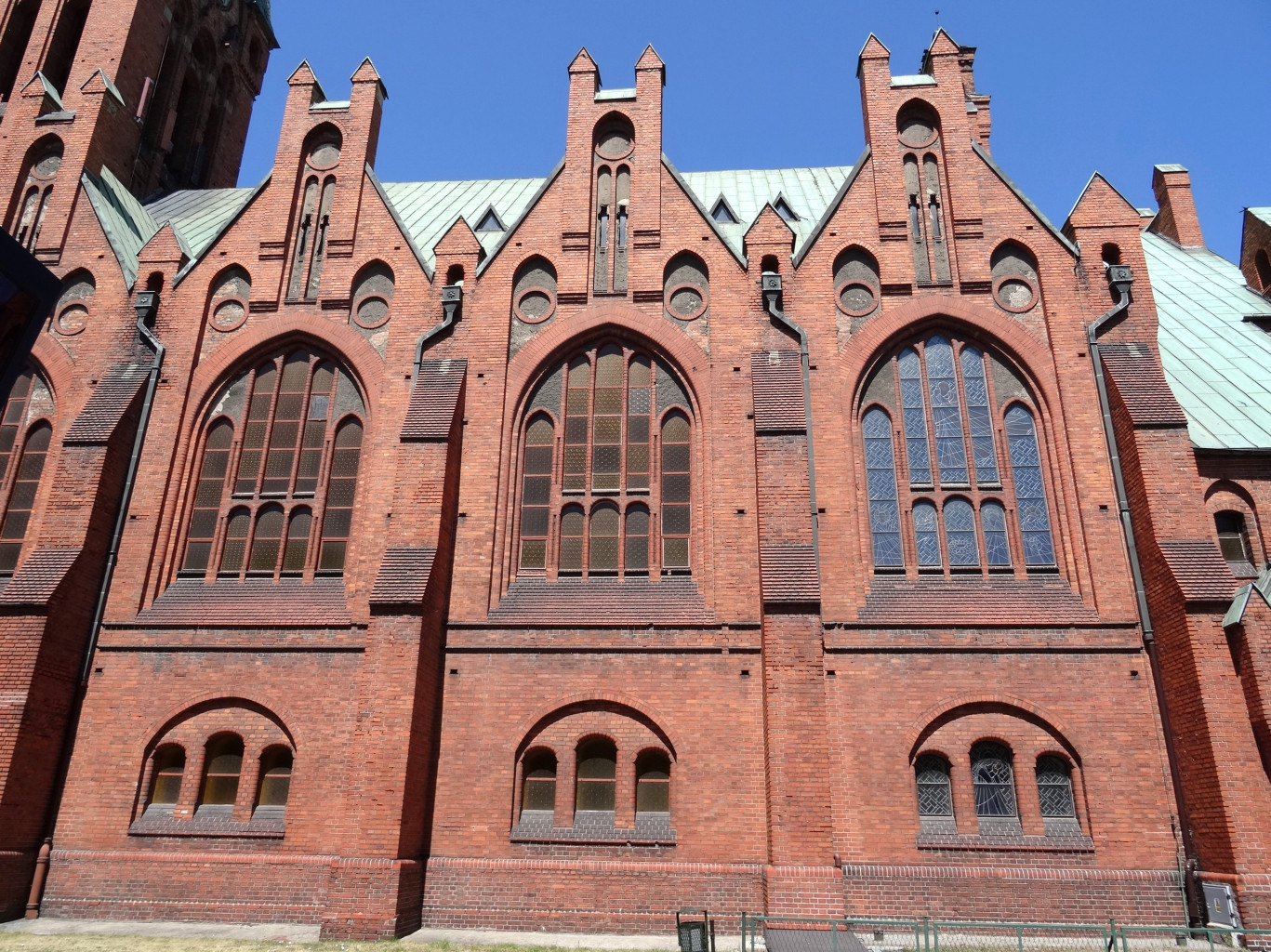
Side frontages

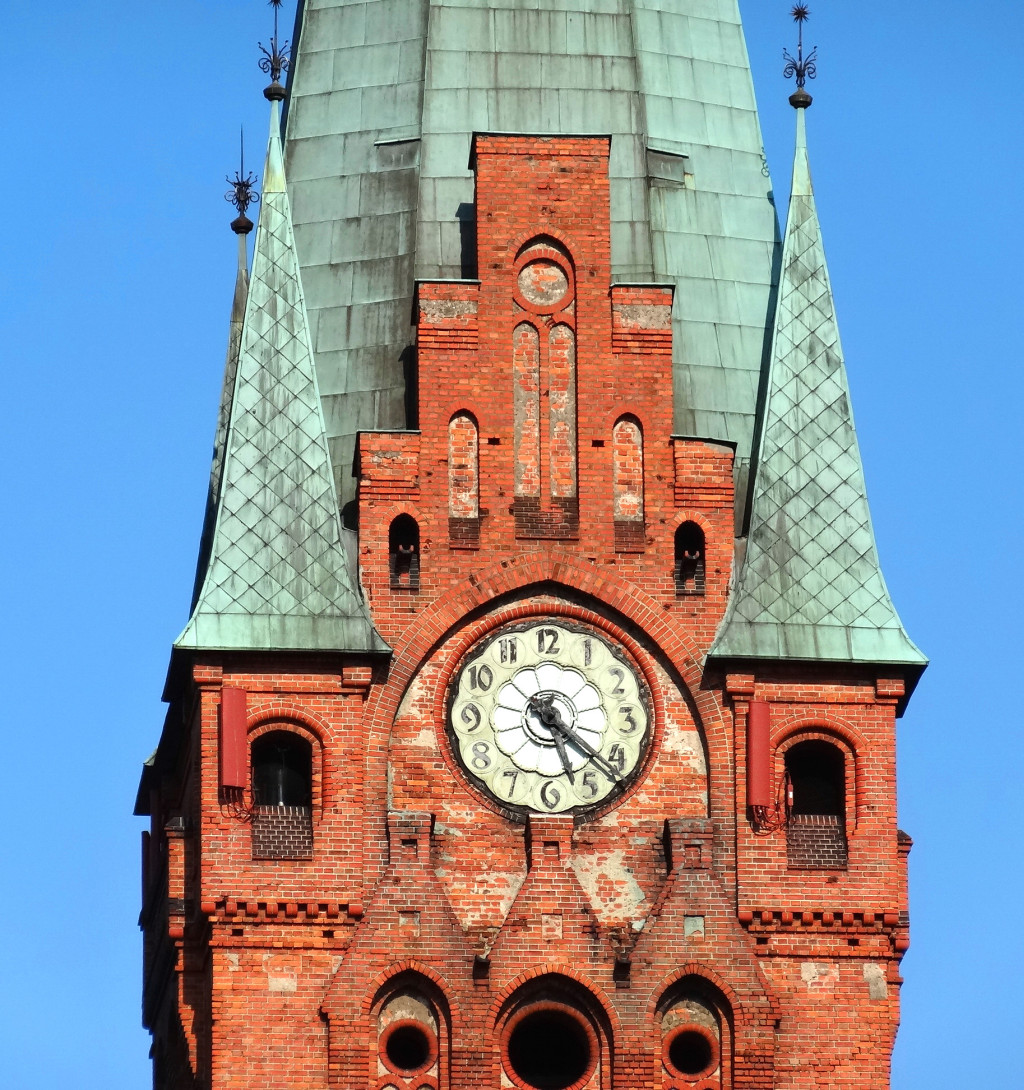
Clock tower and spire

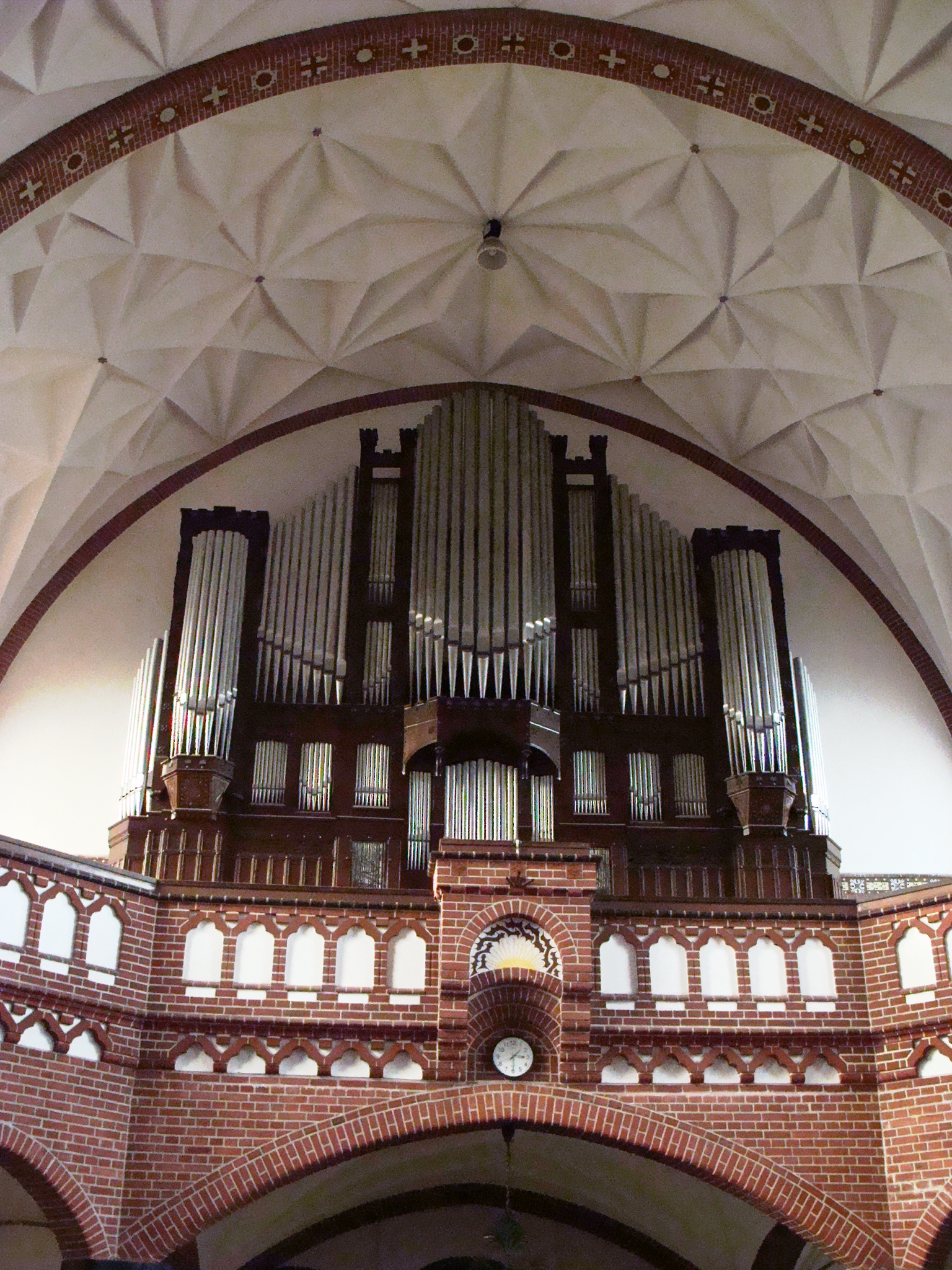
The Pipe organ and the diamond vault ceiling

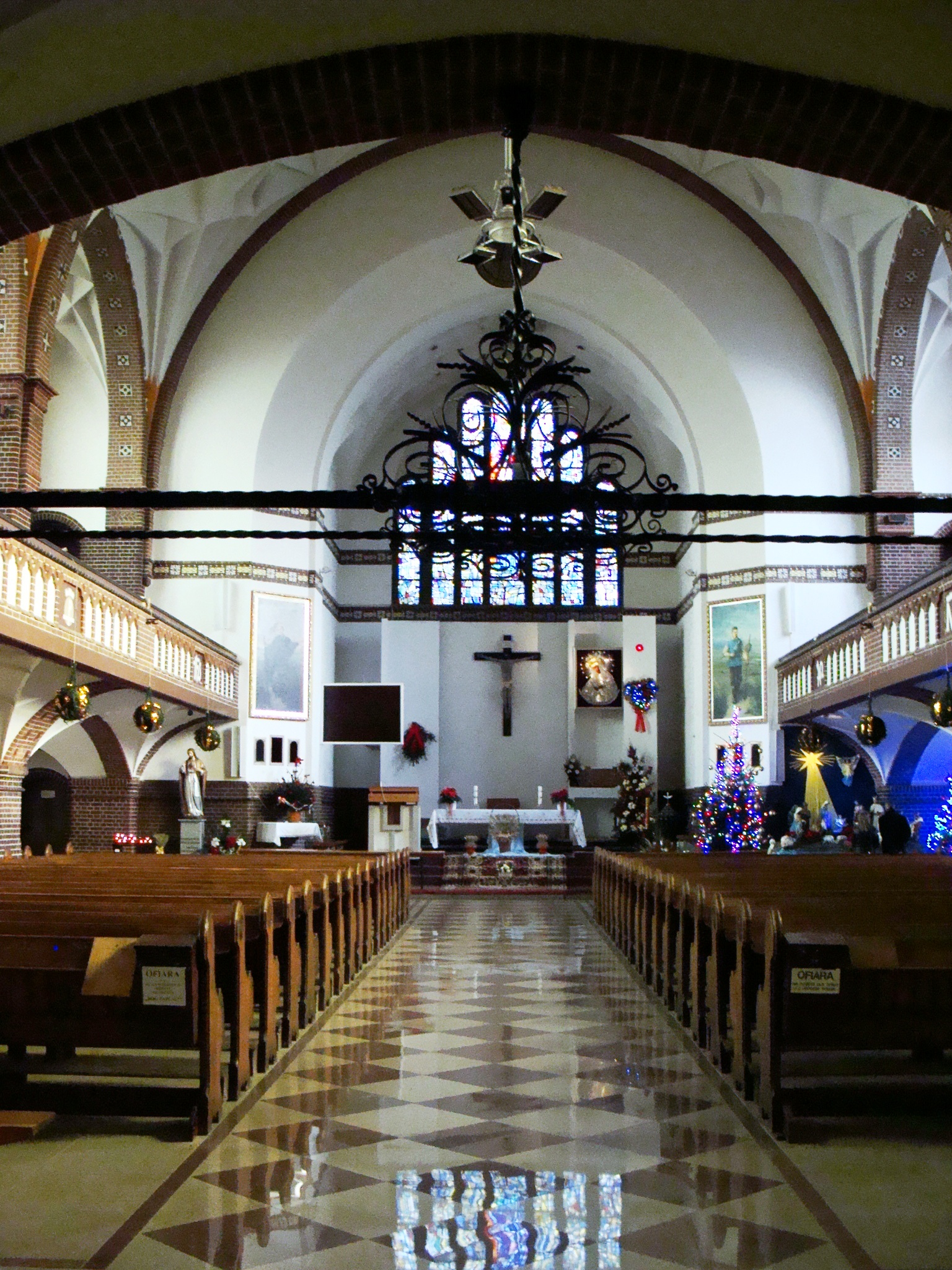
View of the nave

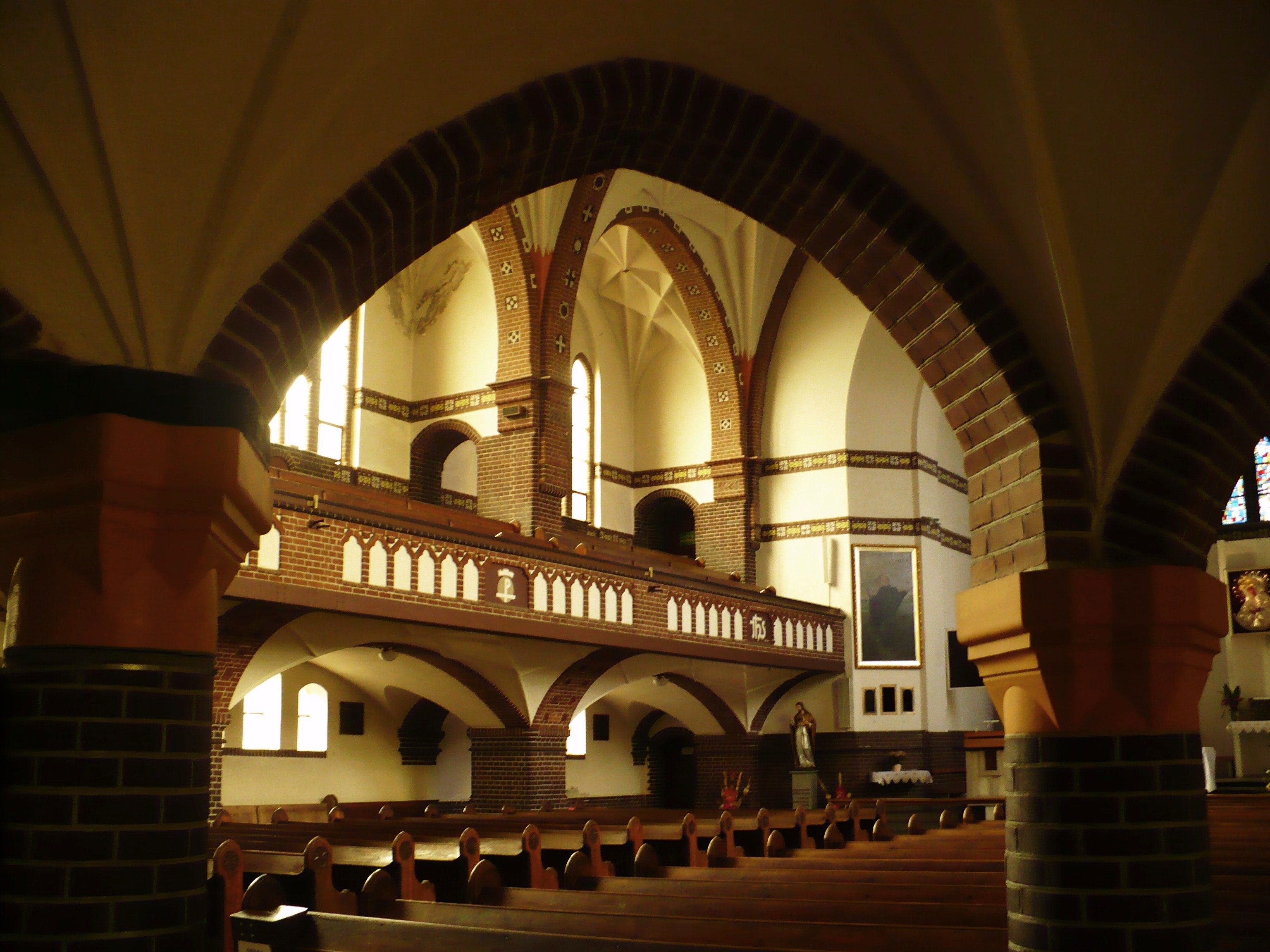
Side gallery

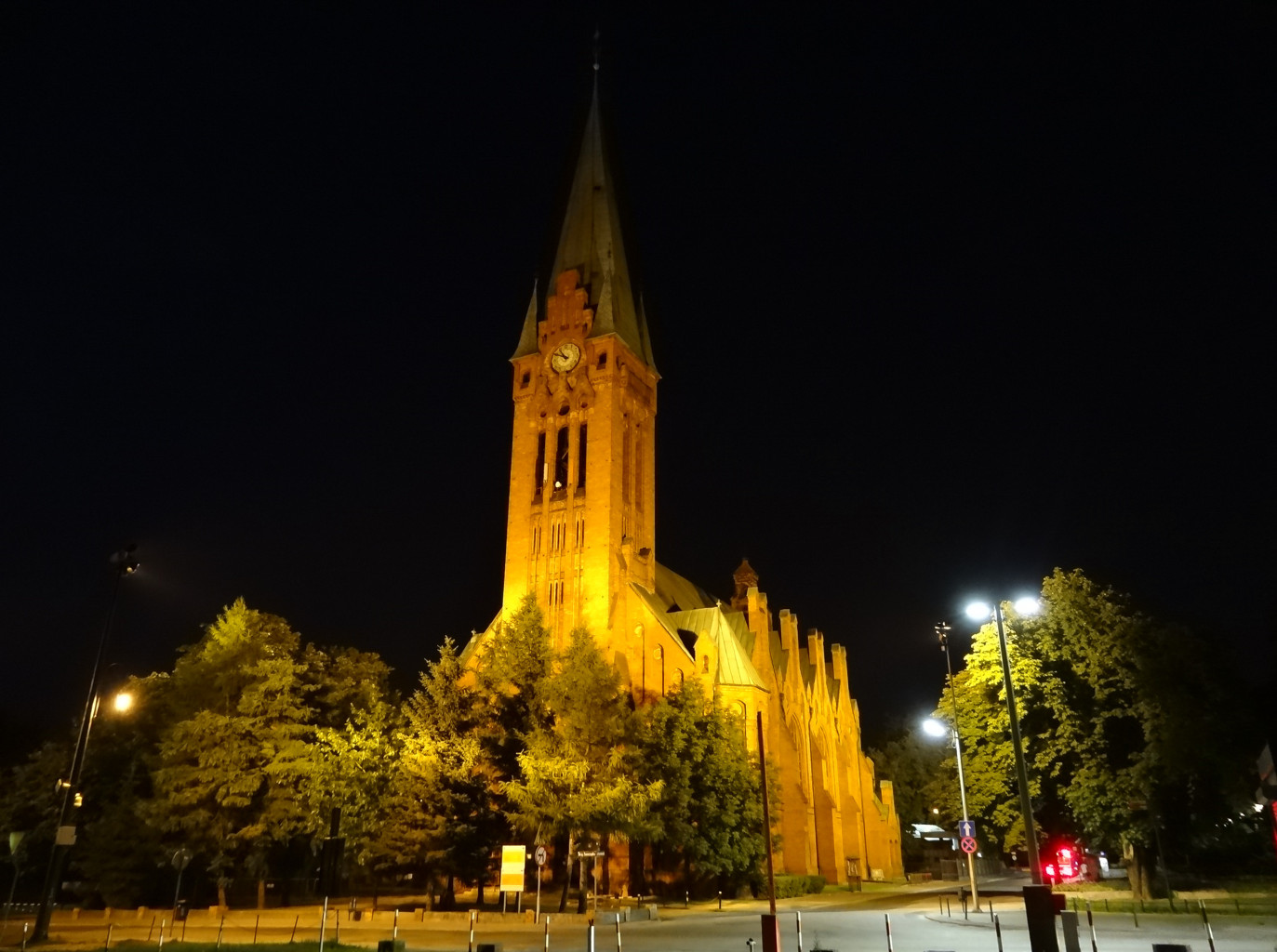
Night lighting

== Bibliography ==
- Bręczewska-Kulesza, Daria (1999). Bydgoskie realizacje Heinricha Seelinga. Materiały do dziejów kultury i sztuki Bydgoszczy i regionu: zeszyt 4 (in Polish). Bydgoszcz: Pracownia dokumentacji i popularyzacji zabytków wojewódzkiego ośrodka kultury w Bydgoszczy.
- Derenda, Jerzy (2006). Piękna stara Bydgoszcz – tom I z serii Bydgoszcz miasto na Kujawach. Praca zbiorowa (in Polish). Bydgoszcz: Towarzystwo Miłośników Miasta Bydgoszczy.
- Kuberska, Inga (1998). Architektura sakralna Bydgoszczy w okresie historyzmu. Materiały do dziejów kultury i sztuki Bydgoszczy i regionu. Zeszyt 3 (in Polish). Bydgoszcz: Pracownia dokumentacji i popularyzacji zabytków wojewódzkiego ośrodka kultury w Bydgoszczy.
- Parucka, Krystyna (2008). Zabytki Bydgoszczy – minikatalog (in Polish). Bydgoszcz: „Tifen” Krystyna Parucka.
- Rogalski, Bogumił (1991). Architektura sakralna Bydgoszczy dawniej i dziś. Kronika Bydgoska XII (in Polish). Bydgoszcz: Towarzystwo Miłosnikow Miasta Bydgoszczy - Bydgoskie Towarzystwo Naukowe. pp. 51–77.
- Mielcarek-Krzyżanowska, Barbara (2006). Bydgoskie Wieczory Organowe u Ojców Jezuitów (in Polish). Bydgoszcz: Wydarzenia muzyczne na Pomorzu i Kujawach. Akademia Muzyczna im. Feliksa Nowowiejskiego w . Prace zbiorowe III nr 23.
