= Kościelecki Square, Bydgoszcz =

Square in Bydgoszcz, Poland

Coordinates: 53°07′15″N 18°00′17″E

Kościelecki Square in Bydgoszcz
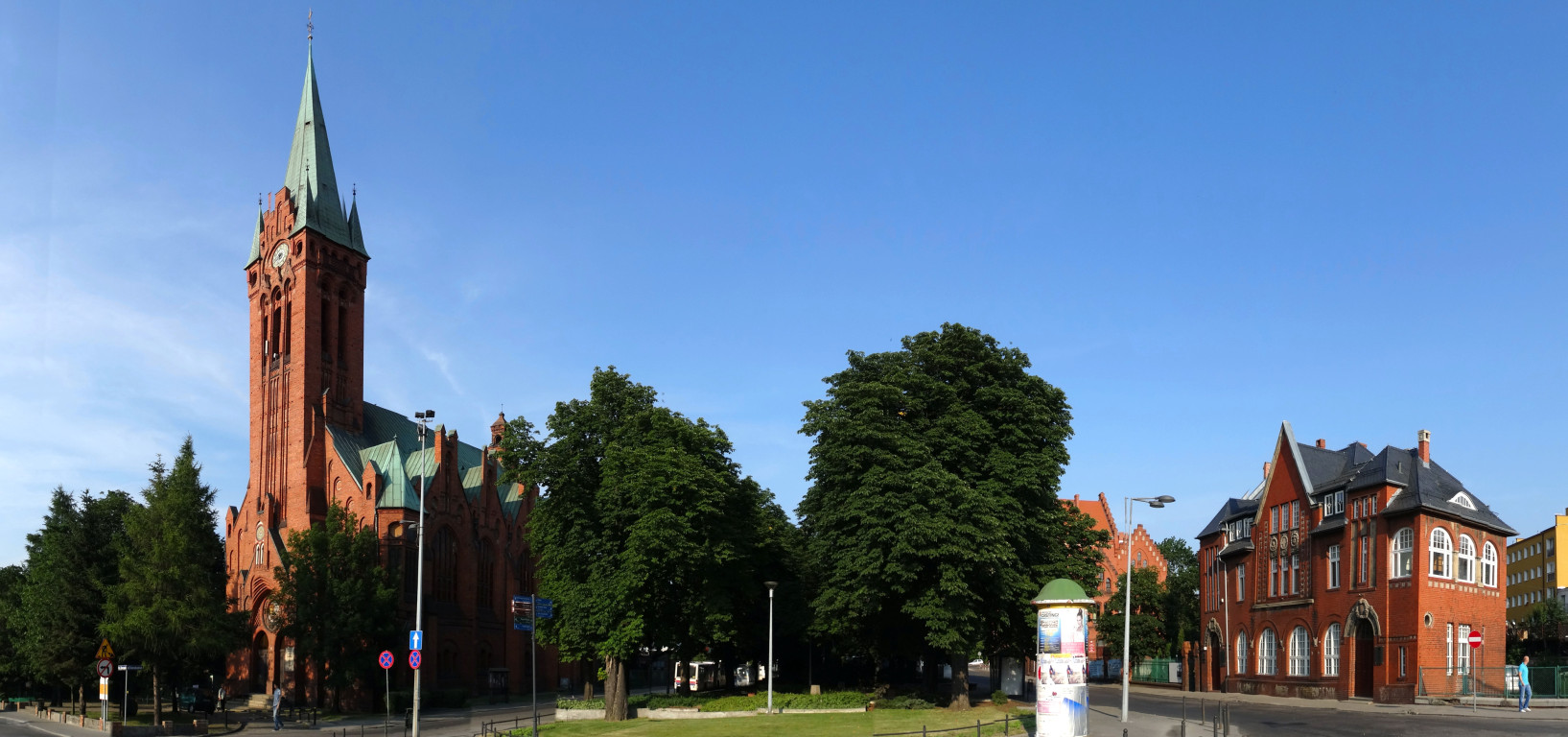
- General View

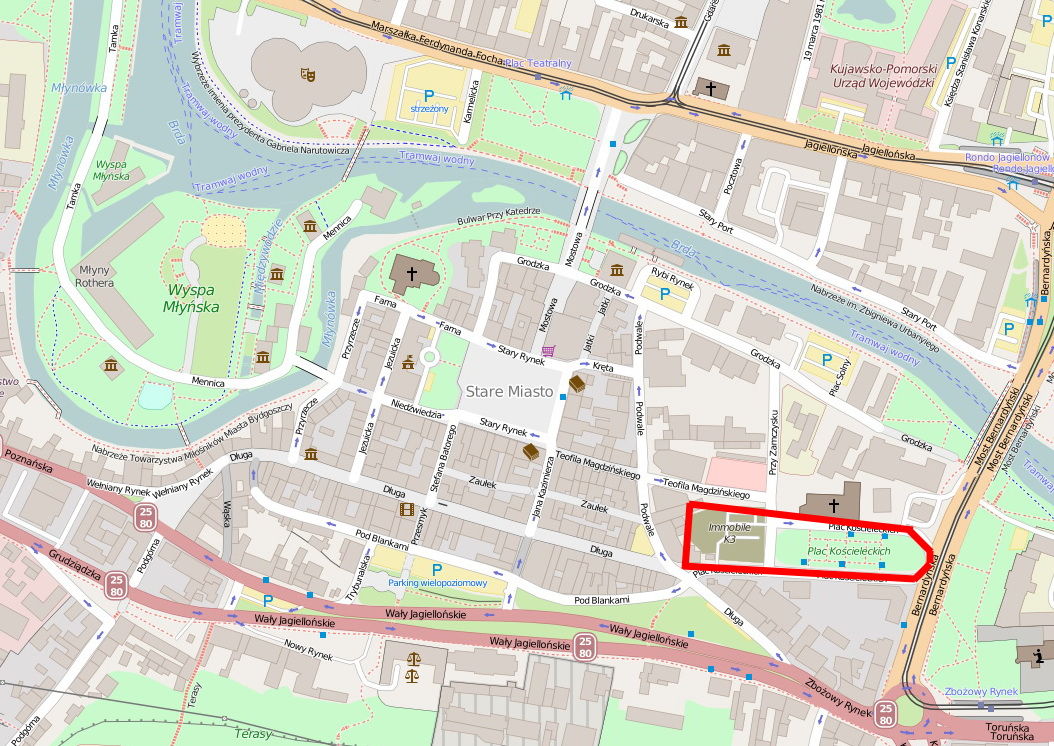
- Square highlighted on Bydgoszcz Map
- Native name: Plac Kościeleckich w Bydgoszczy (Polish)
- Former names: Hann-von-Weyhern-Platz, Plac Rewolucji Październikowej
- Type: Square
- Owner: City of Bydgoszcz
- Location: Bydgoszcz, Poland

The Kościelecki Square is an old and historical place in downtown Bydgoszcz. Around the area are several buildings registered on the Kuyavian-Pomeranian Voivodeship Heritage List.

== Location ==
Kościelecki Square is located in the historical part of Old Bydgoszcz. It has a rectangular shape (200 metres (660 ft)×40 metres (130 ft)), with an east–west orientation, which central part is full of greenery. On the east, it is bordered by Bernardyńska Street, on the west by Przy Zamczysku street and its southern edge is lined up to the west with Długa street.

The main edifice in the area is Saint Andrew Bobola's Church, standing on the northern edge. The southern side displays a frontage of buildings, among which the ancient Hospital for infants (German: Kleinkinder Klinik) at Nr.7, and the former school for girls (German: Erste Mädchen von Volkschule) both dating back from the beginning of the 20th century. To the west is being constructed a modern business project, Immobile|K3.

== History ==
From the 11th to the 14th century, the area north of the square was occupied by a small city castle, destroyed in July 1330, by the Teutonic Knights. At its place, in accordance with the wishes of Casimir the Great, was built from 1347 to 1360 a royal castle. It played an important defense role during the 15th century Polish-Teutonic War but was pulled down during the 17th century Swedish invasion. From that time until 1895, the place was a wasteland, partly used by inhabitants as gardens. The castle moat, no longer needed, was filled in the 18th century.

In 1899, the Prussian authorities began to work on the revitalisation of this area on the eastern outskirts of the Old Town which remained so far out of any city urban planning:

- To the east, on the place of the old Protestant temple from the 18th century (disbanded in 1903), was constructed the Municipal Market Hall (today at 41 Podwale Street);
- To the south of the castle area was built a new evangelical church (Holy Cross, today Saint Andrew Bobola's parish) on a design by Heinrich Seeling;
- Kirchen straße (Church Street, today Teofila Magdzińskiego street) was extended to the west, to complete the perspective on the new church;
- A new street was created, Wiese Straße (today Przy Zamczysku street) to link Grodzka Street in the north to the square (then Hann-von-Weyhern Platz) to the south;
- On the southern side of the square were built two edifices designed by Carl Meyer, the hospital for infants and the school for girls.

In the late 19th-early 20th century, the place was known as the city meat market (German: Städtischer fleischmarkt).

In 1908, the square was planted with four rows of chestnut trees, with carriage alleys on both sides. In 1937, 67 chestnut trees were reported on Kościelecki Square, while lawns and flower beds were laid in the middle of the square, divided by alleys.

From 1935 until the mid-1970s, on Kościelecki Square was located the main city bus station. After transferring the buses hub to the newly built terminal at Jagiellońska street (Nr.58), the area was rebuilt between 1978 and 1980 into a rectangular shape with flower beds. However, the square kept a busy bus traffic from January 1976, with 5 lines (51, 56, 58, 66 and 101) interconnecting there.

In August 2015, the former station pavilion was torn down to give way to a new office building project, Immobile|K3, to be delivered in the first quarter of 2018; works started on June 7, 2016.

In January 2017, 6 chestnut trees were cut down and removed from the square due to infection.

=== Naming ===
In the past, Kościelecki Square bore the following names:

- 1899–1920, Hann von-Weyhern Platz, from Benno Hann von Weyhern (1808-1890), a Prussian cavalry general;
- 1920–1939, Plac Kościeleckich;
- 1939–1945, Hann von-Weyhern Platz;
- 1945–1949, Plac Kościeleckich;
- 1949–1956, Plac Rewolucji Październikowej (Square of the October Revolution);
- Since 1956, Plac Kościeleckich.

The current namesake of the square commemorates the Kościelecki family, whose members had an active role during Bydgoszcz Golden Age (1457-1600), as starosta (e.g. Andrzej Kościelecki, Stanisław Kościelecki, Mikołaj Kościelecki).

== Main places and buildings ==
=== Tenement at 4 ===
1927-1928

This building was designed to house personnel of close by shelter for poor infants (at Nr.6), from the director to servants (Polish: służący). In the late 1930s, an additional building has been constructed on the right, close to Długa street (today at Nr.5).

The building has a terrace surrounded by a balustrade adorned by ornamental urns on its top. The facade displays a nice wrought iron balcony.

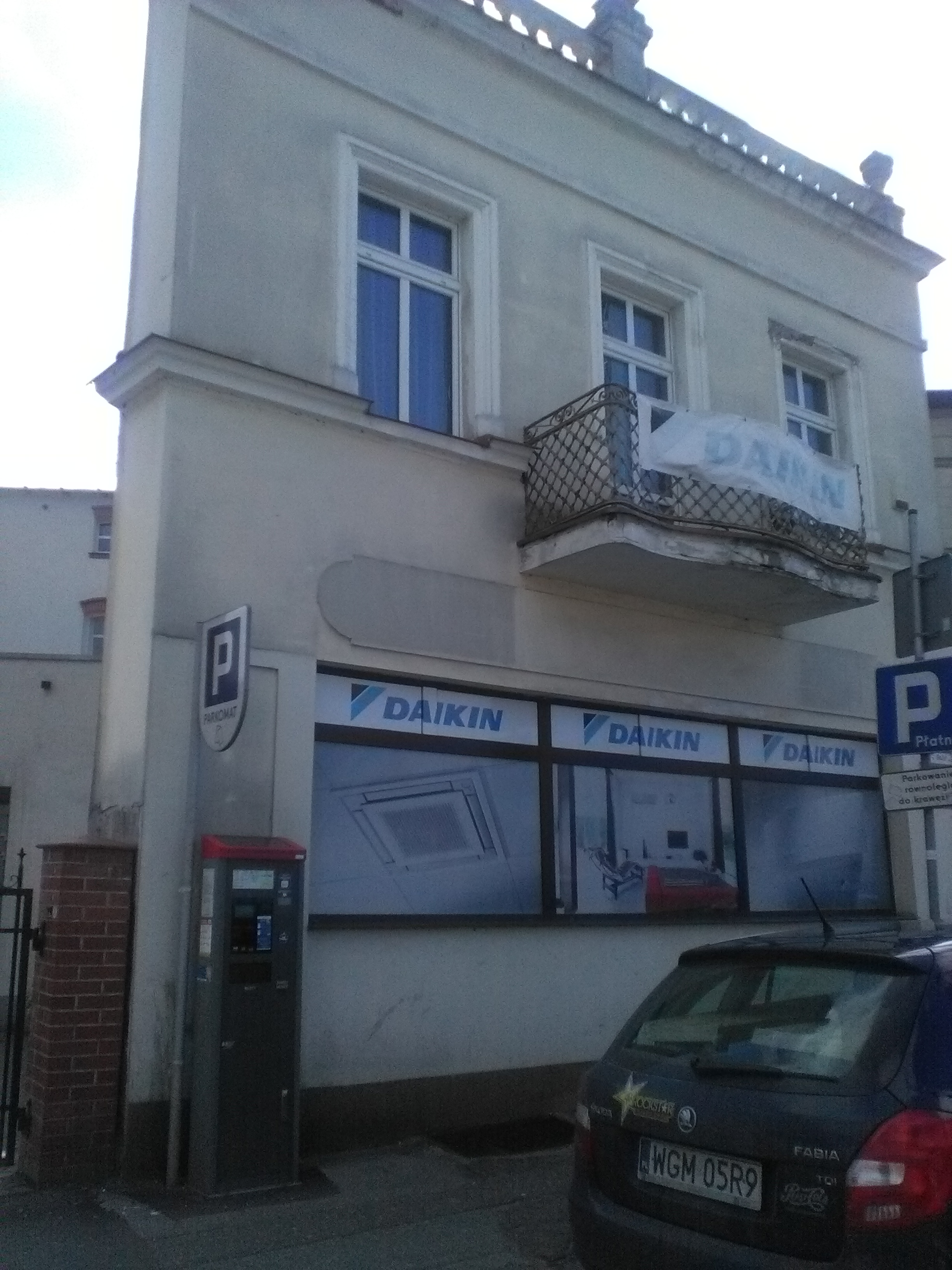
View from the square

=== Kuyavia-Pomerania Cultural Centre, at 6 ===
Registered on Kuyavian-Pomeranian Voivodeship Heritage List (Nr.723990, Reg. A/1397), December 1, 2008

1908–1909, by Carl Meyer

Neo-Gothic

The building was erected in 1908, at the initiative of the Patriotic Association of Women (German: Vaterländische Frauenverein), as an Infant Dispensary. Indeed, in the early 20th century, infant mortality in Bromberg was extremely high (22% in 1928), mostly caused by acute infectious diseases, pneumonia and diarrhea. Hence the urgent need to improve medical care. Augusta Victoria of Schleswig-Holstein, first wife of Wilhelm II, German Emperor, had appealed for the construction of special homes for young children (German: Säulingsheime) in largest cities of Prussia. A special foundation was set up in Bromberg, so as to build an infant hospital with a kitchen for the poor. The municipality donated the plot of land to the foundation, at the time located on Hann von-Weyhern Platz, next to recently constructed School for girls and Evangelical church. Together with the plot assignment, a construction project was realized by architect Carl Meyer. The main donator (60 000 German gold mark), Julius Berger, expressed the wish to have the facility named after the empress Augusta Victoria of Schleswig-Holstein, as Auguste-Viktoria-Heim. Julius was a Jewish property developer and city councillor.

On the ground floor stood a kitchen for the poor, with a room for 100 people. On the first floor, there were a nursing home, a small 25-bed hospital with three sick rooms, a glassed veranda, a terrace, a kitchen, a bathroom, a flat for a sister and a nurse. The attic housed a laundry room, a drying room and an auxiliary room.

The opening ceremony took place on April 2, 1909, and on July 1, the facility started operating. At the hospital, which soon became known as the Kleinkinder Clinic (Toddler clinic), young infants were coming not only from Bromberg city but also from other regions (e.g. Silesia, Brandenburg). Approximately 130 patients were cared for each year, and the institution soon set up a clinic for young mothers in the premises. During World War I, nursing courses were also organized by city doctors like Elimar Schendell (living at Gdańska Street 42) and Hermann Dietz (living at Gdańska Street 88/90).

After the war, the need of a separate hospital for infants no longer necessary, its functions were taken over by the pediatric ward of the Provincial Hospital for Infectious Diseases set on Saint Florian Street. The facility on Plac Kościelecki, managed by Dr. Hermann Dietz, survived until 1926, when the municipal authorities purchased the property from the Deutscher Frauenverein to create there a shelter for young orphans (up to 2 years old) (Polish: Ochronkę dla Niemowląt). Personnel comprised in particular six sisters from the Daughters of Charity of Saint Vincent de Paul, five servants, two schoolgirls and later wet nurses. The shelter welcomed about 140 children each year.

In 1939, German forces restored the Infant Dispensary in the building, and just after World War II, the edifice resumed its medical purposes. From 1945 to 1946, there was a Maternity and Children Care Station. Following a couple-of-months occupation by the army, the building became for a few years a residential area. But in 1951, a Special Child Counseling Clinic reopened in the premises, operating until the end of the 20th century within the Central Regional Child Motherhood and Child Health Counseling Center.

Since 2000, the building has been housing the Kujawsko-Pomorskie Culture Centre in Bydgoszcz (Polish: Kujawsko-Pomorskiego Centrum Kultury w Bydgoszczy).

In 2014, a thorough renovation has been carried out, including the construction of a new wing, accommodating a spectacle hall. After overhaul, a plaque was set near the main entry to recall the memory of Julius and Flora Berger, main funders of the edifice in the early 20th century. Since 2015, it houses also an amateur and professional art gallery.

The facade is characteristic of the Hanover school of architecture which influenced Carl Meyer works. Brick wall facades show few exterior plaster, decorative sculptures or colored surfaces. Ground level openings are round top, main entries are crowned with plaster decoration displaying festoons and angel faces. Below the middle gable, three symbols recalls the original purpose of the building: a boat (i.e. the shelter'), a cross (i.e. the hospital) and an eagle (i.e. the namesake of the dispensary)

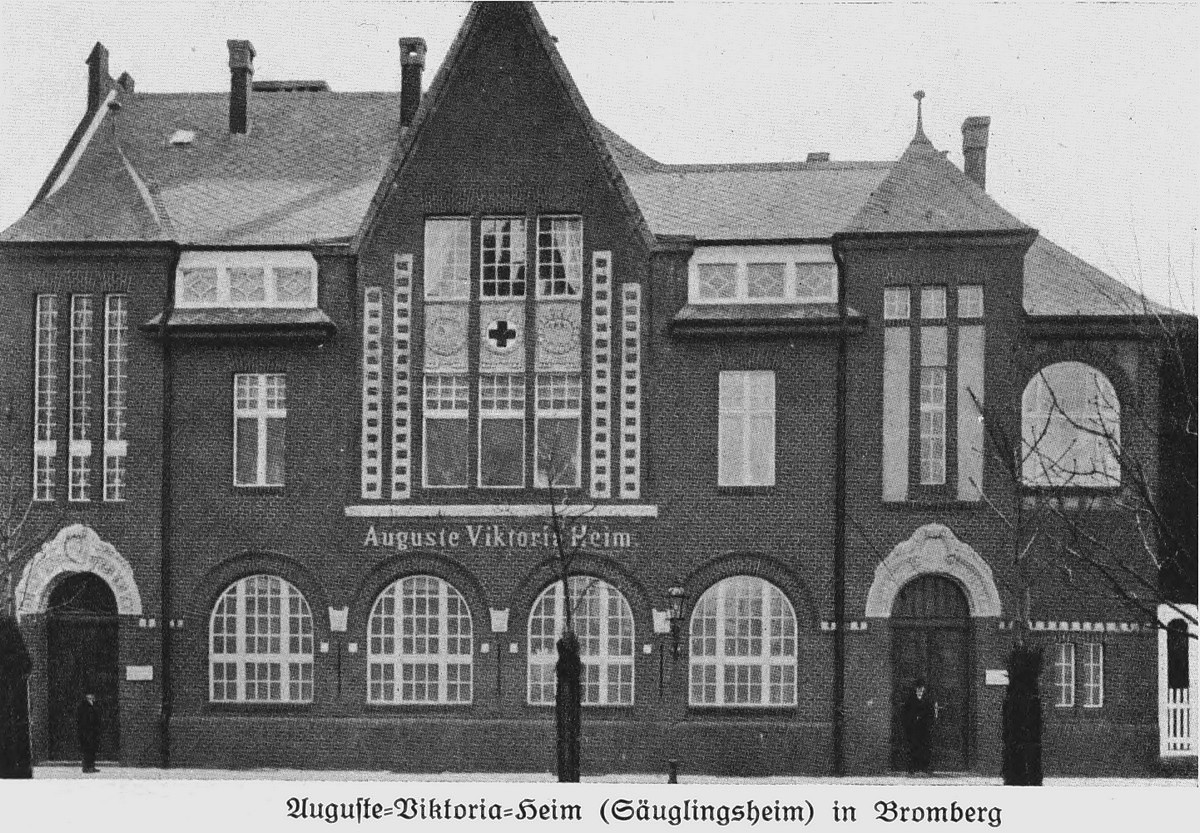
The Infant Dispensary ca 1911

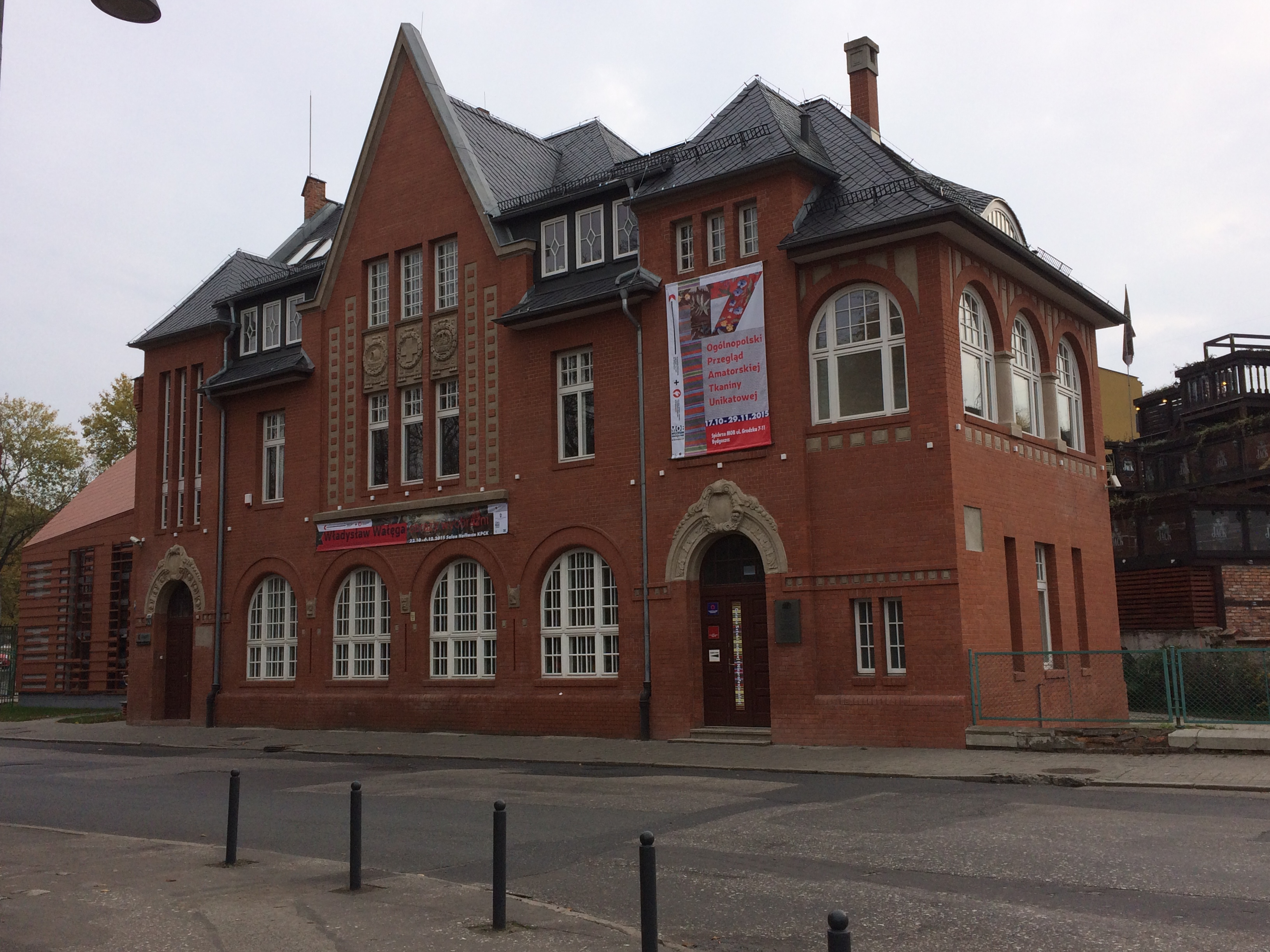
View from the square

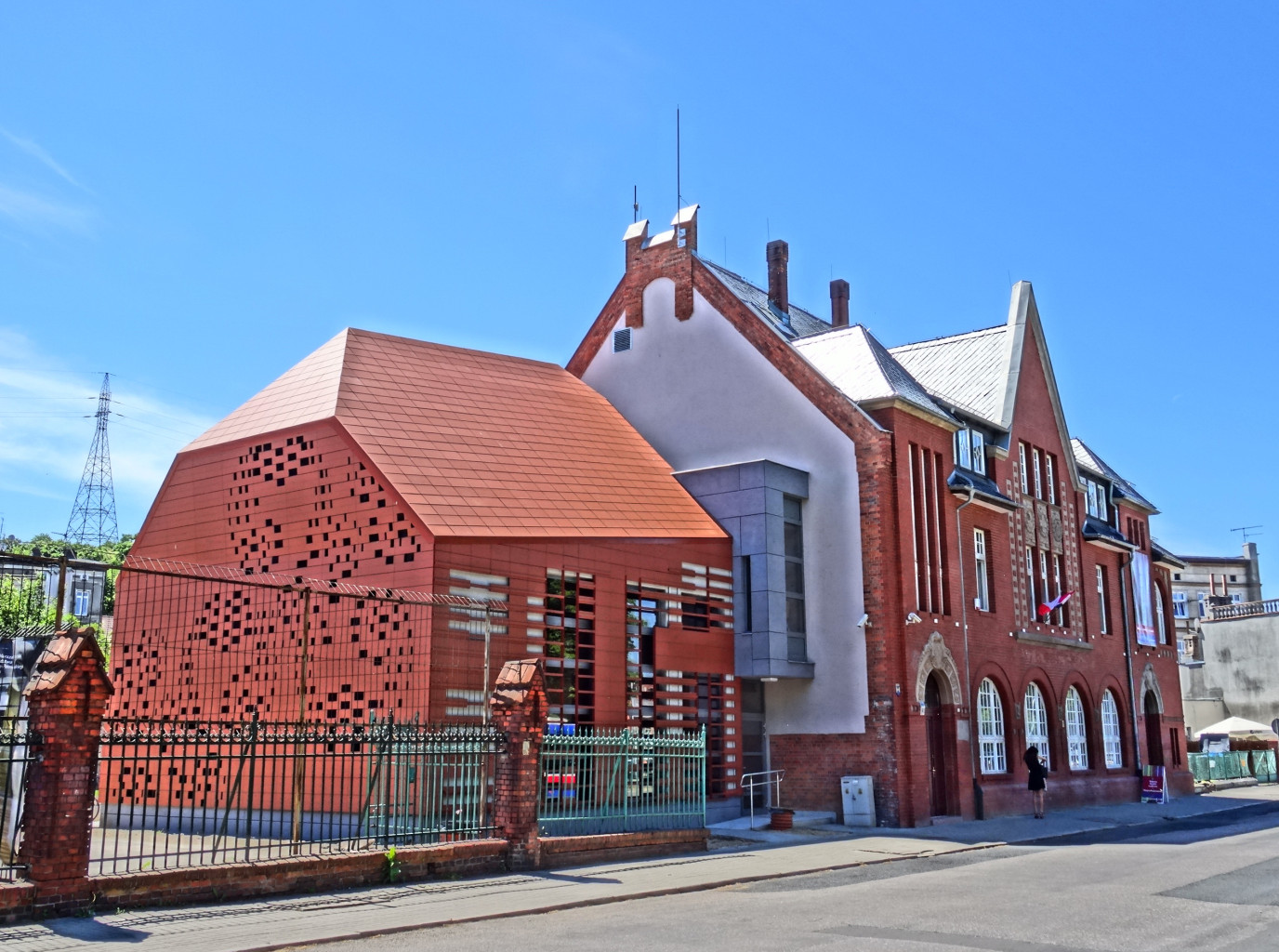
The new wing

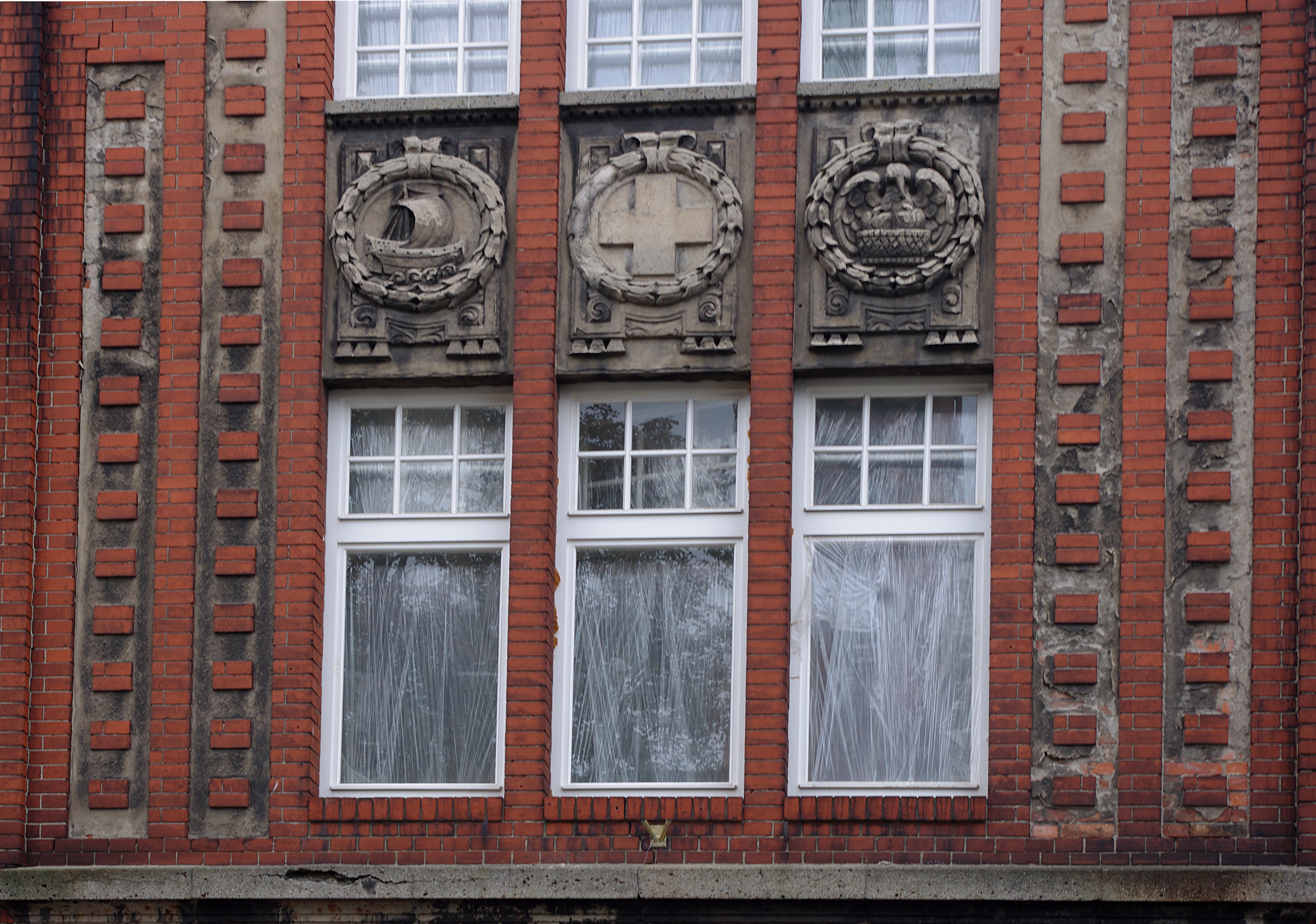
Facade ornamentation

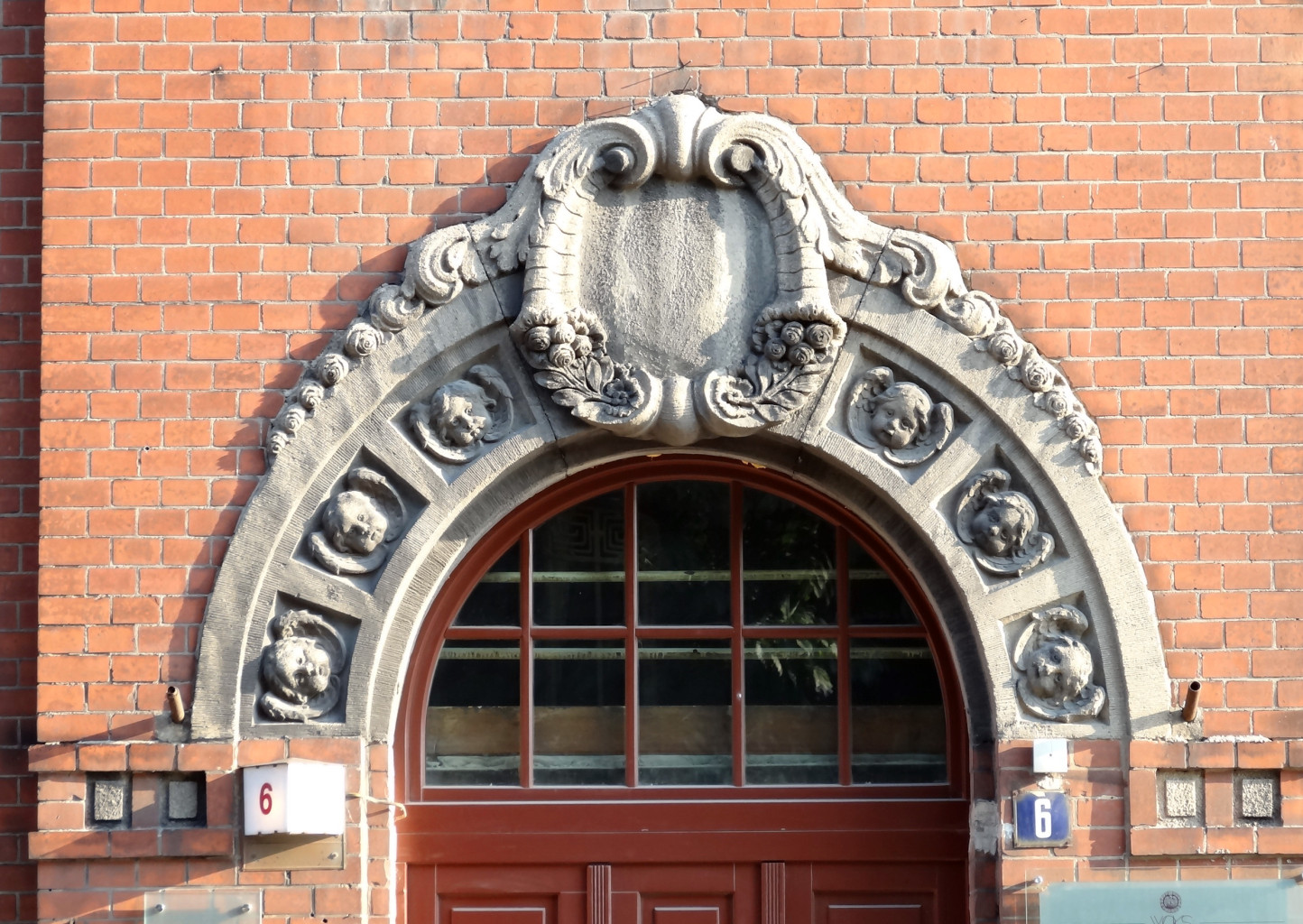
Portal detail

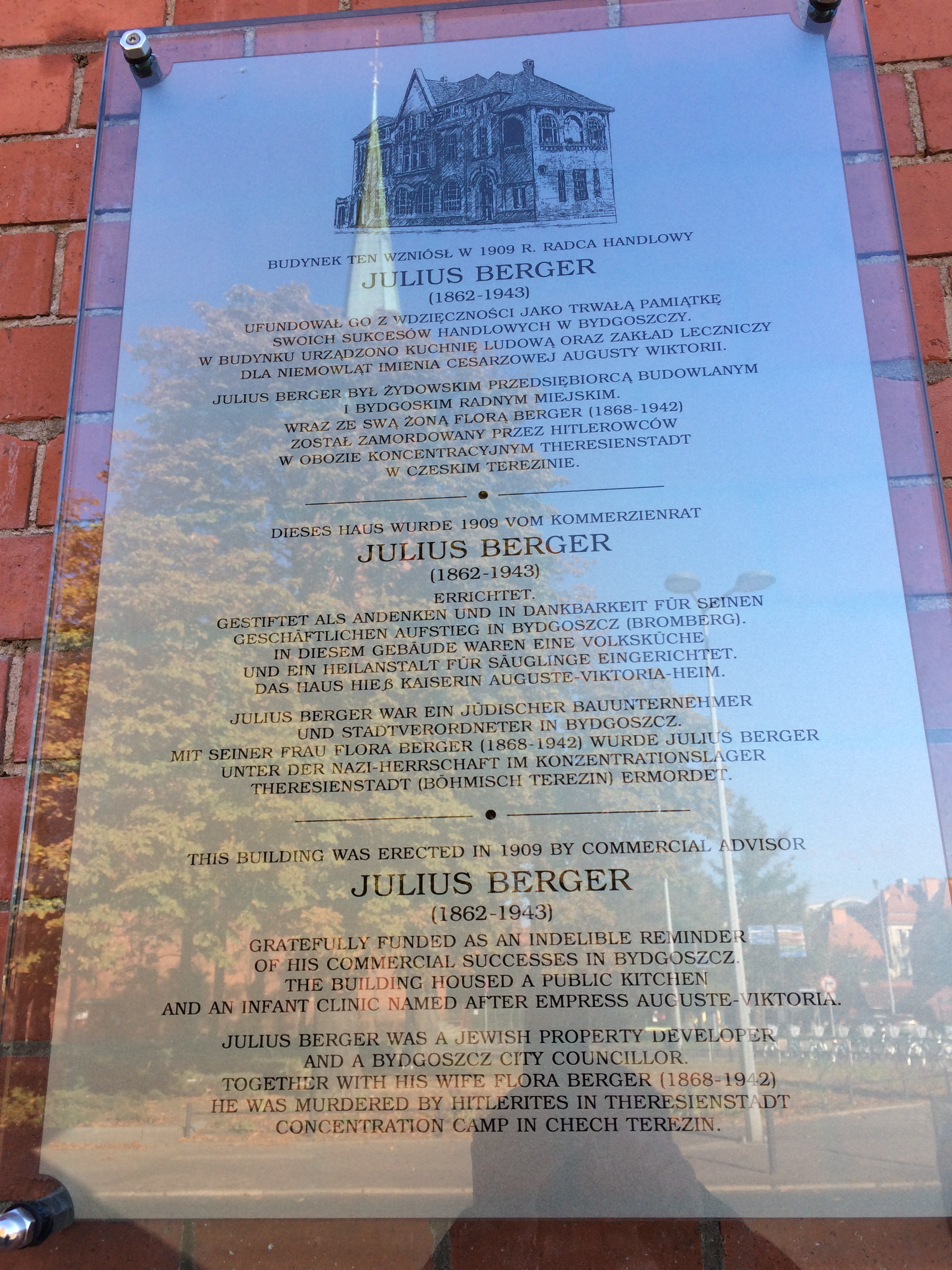
Julius Berger plaque

=== Saint Andrew Bobola's Church, at 7 ===
Registered on Kuyavian-Pomeranian Voivodeship Heritage List on December 15, 1998

1903, by Heinrich Seeling

Neo-Gothic

The author of the project was Berlin architect Heinrich Seeling, famous in Bydgoszcz for other realisations, such as the Municipal Theatre, the Church of the Savior, and houses (tenement at Jagiellońska Street 4 or Villa Heinrich Dietz).The reception of the unfinished edifice took place on October 22, 1903. In 1946, the church, was handed over to the management of the Society of Jesus.

Since 2001, the Bydgoszcz Music Academy - "Feliks Nowowiejski" organizes in the church a festival of organ music, and since 2006 "Organ Evenings" sessions are held.

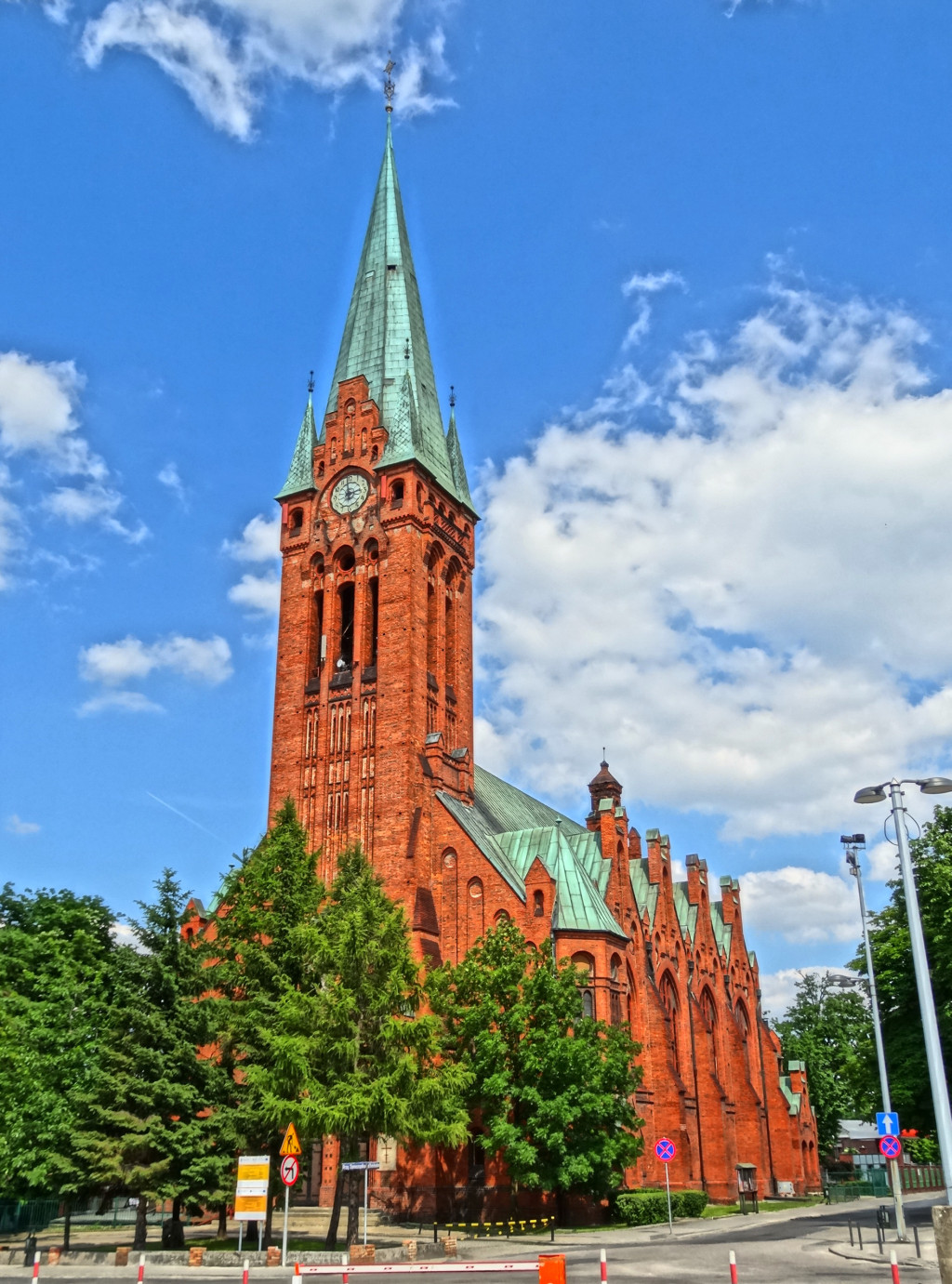
View from the square

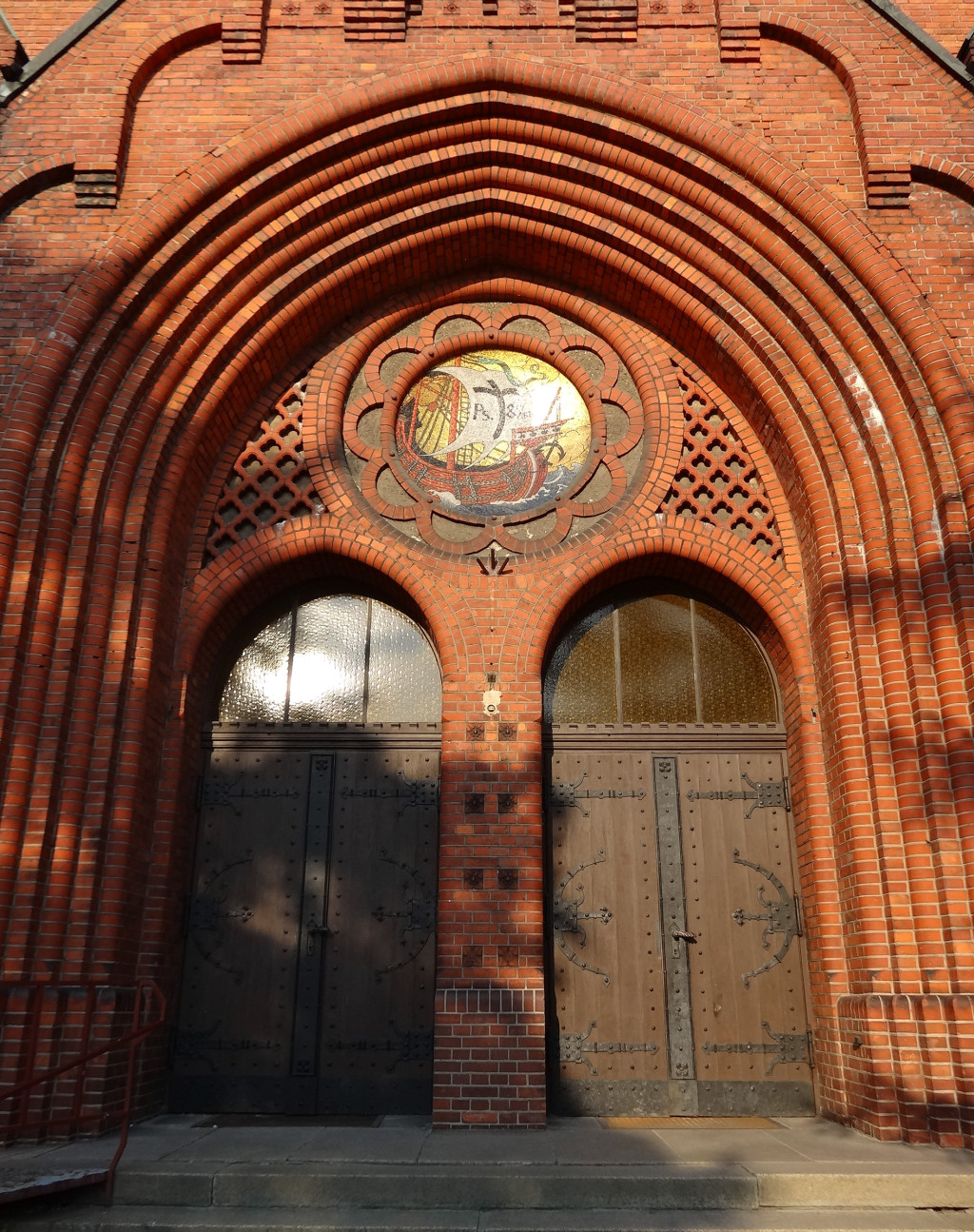
Main Portal

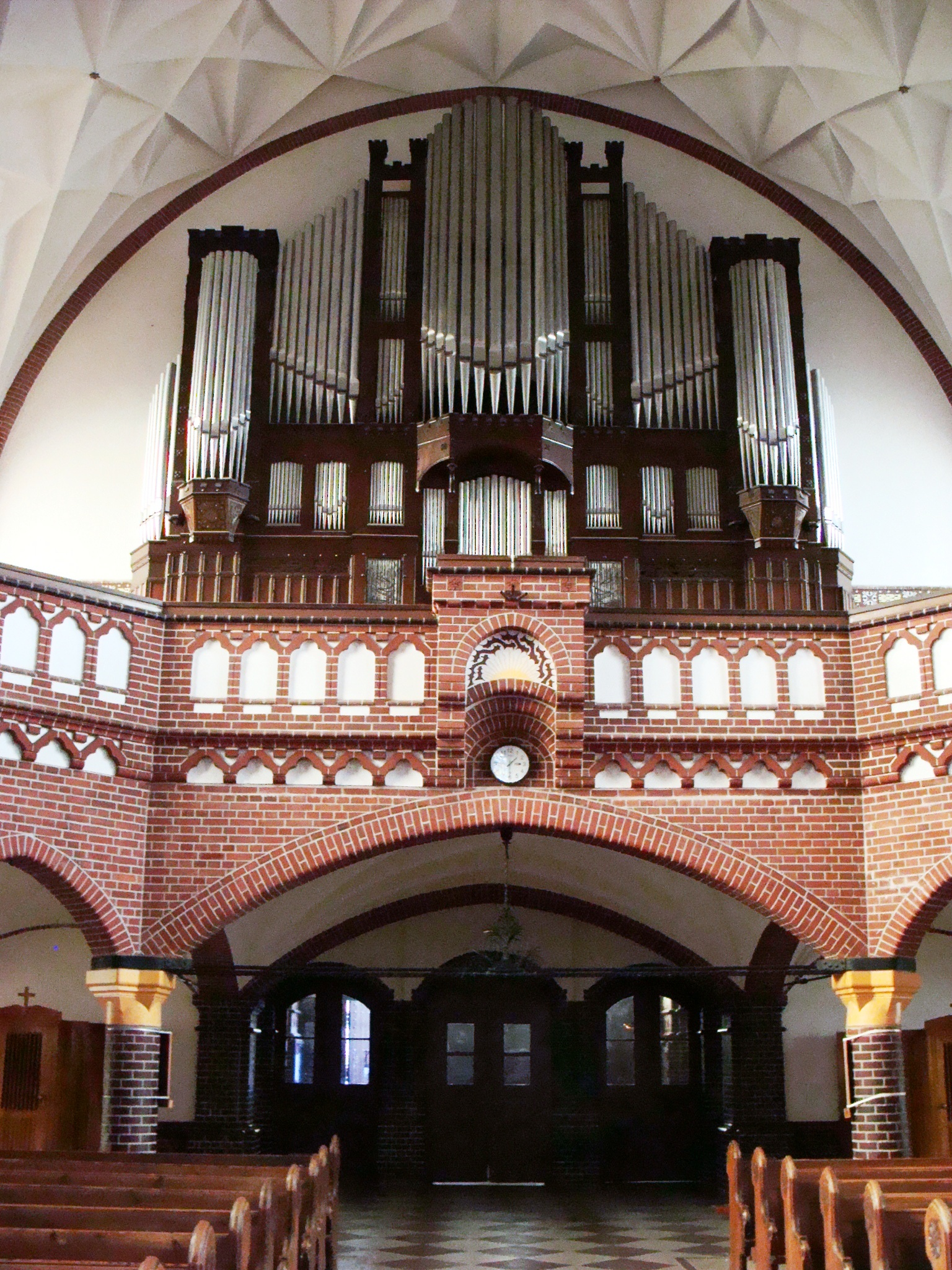
The pipe organ

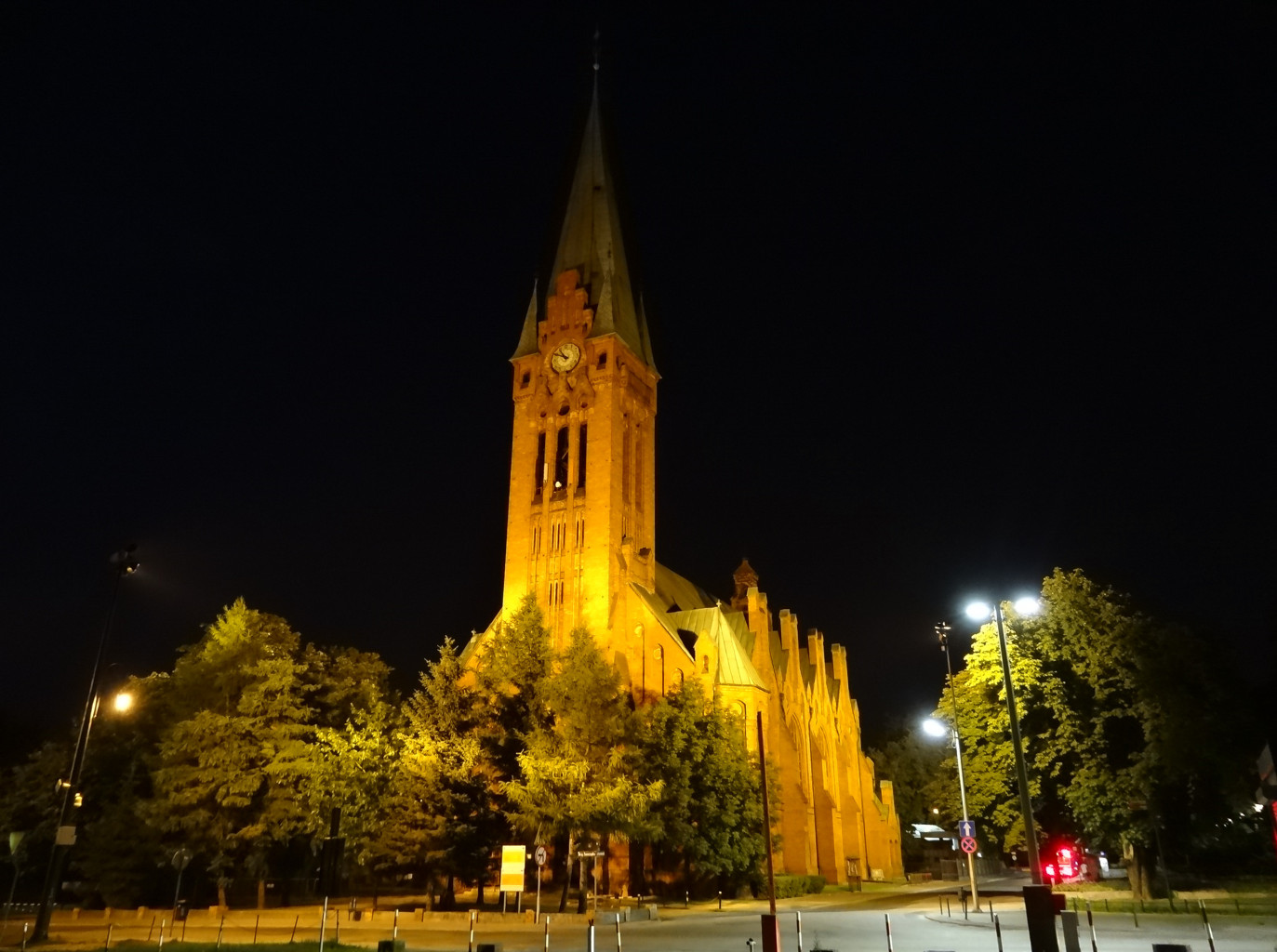
By night

=== Department of Journalism and Social Communication of UKW, at 8 ===
1890–1892, by Carl Meyer

Registered on Kuyavian-Pomeranian Voivodeship Heritage List (Nr.601370, Reg. A/888), June 21, 1993

Neo-Gothic

The building was constructed from 1890 to 1892, on a design by architect Carl Meyer. By 1920, it served as the first school for girls ((in German) Erste Mädchen von Volkschule). In 1921, the building housed a Polish primary school K. Piramowicz. It was a 7-class, primary school, for which headmaster in 1925 was Father Smarzyk, and in 1933 Father Menzel. By 1930, it functioned together with the German, evangelical primary school, located in a wing of the building. In 1933 were created two schools of mixed (girls and boys) pupils.

During German occupation, the edifice accommodated for some time a prison, then in 1945 a military hospital. After World War II, it housed primary school Nr. 8 Tadeusz Kościuszko. With the school Nr.8 in 2004, and after considering to lodge there city's appeal court, it has been eventually decided to put a Secondary School of Organization and Management. Since 2007, the building also houses the Museum of Freedom and Solidarity in Bydgoszcz.

In 2010, the building has been transferred to the ownership of Bydgoszcz's University "Casimir the Great".

The building's architecture is characteristic of 19th century's public buildings in Bydgoszcz, with references to the neo-gothic and Neo-Romanesque. The designer Carl Meyer has been influenced by the Hanover school of architecture, characterized by brick facades and absence of exterior plaster, decorative sculptures and colored surface. Carl Meyer also realised several other edifices in downtown Bydgoszcz, among others:

- House at Gdanska Street 60;
- House at 6 August Cieszkowskiego Street;
- Bydgoszcz Water supply station, along with architect Marshall.

The building has a "L" shape with wings, two-storey, a basement and an attic. The elevation is divided by pilasters and adorned with brick-made friezes running under the cornice, like dentils. Avant-corps are topped with crow-stepped gable, typical of Carl Meyer's works.

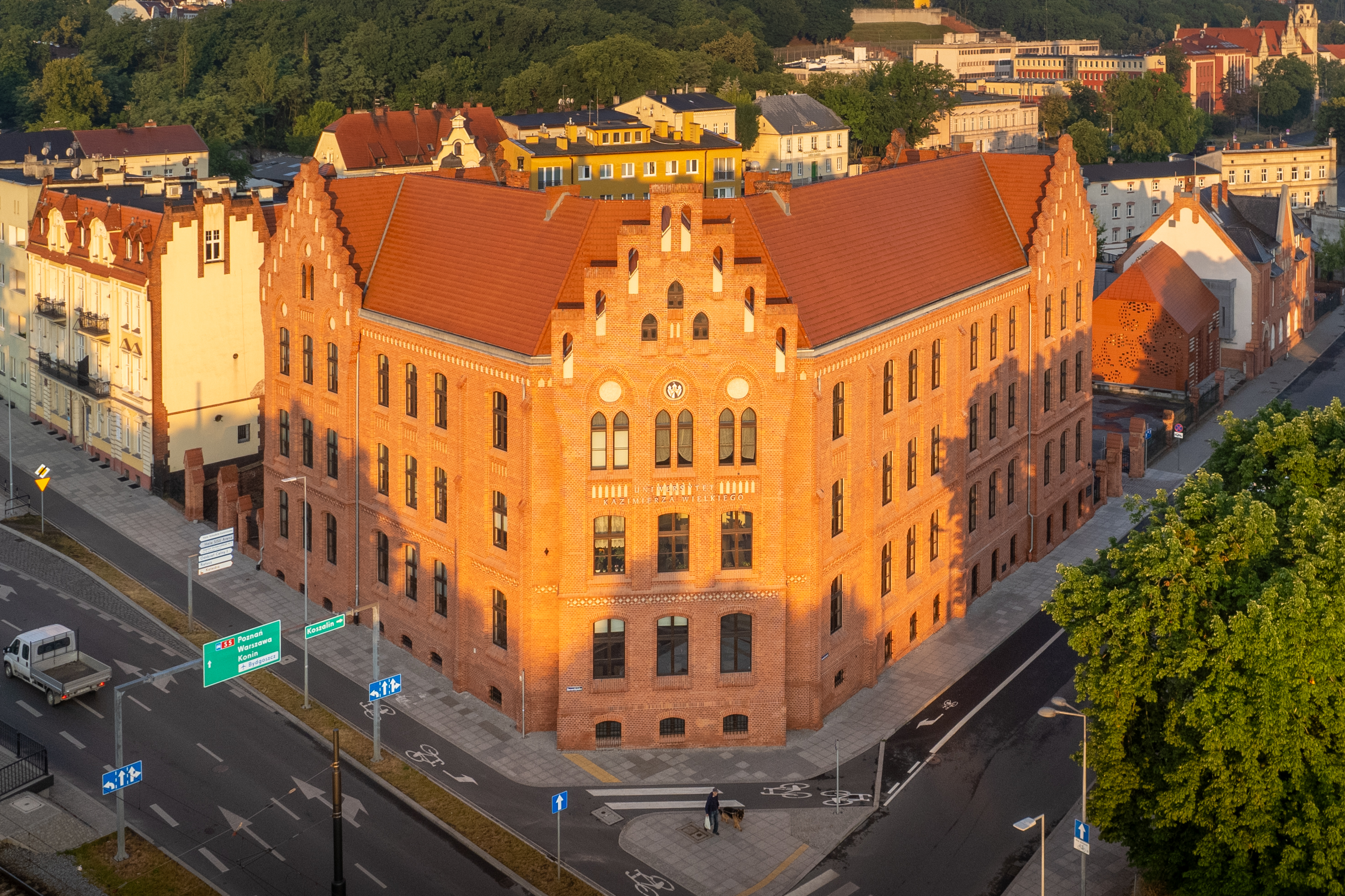
Bird's-eye view

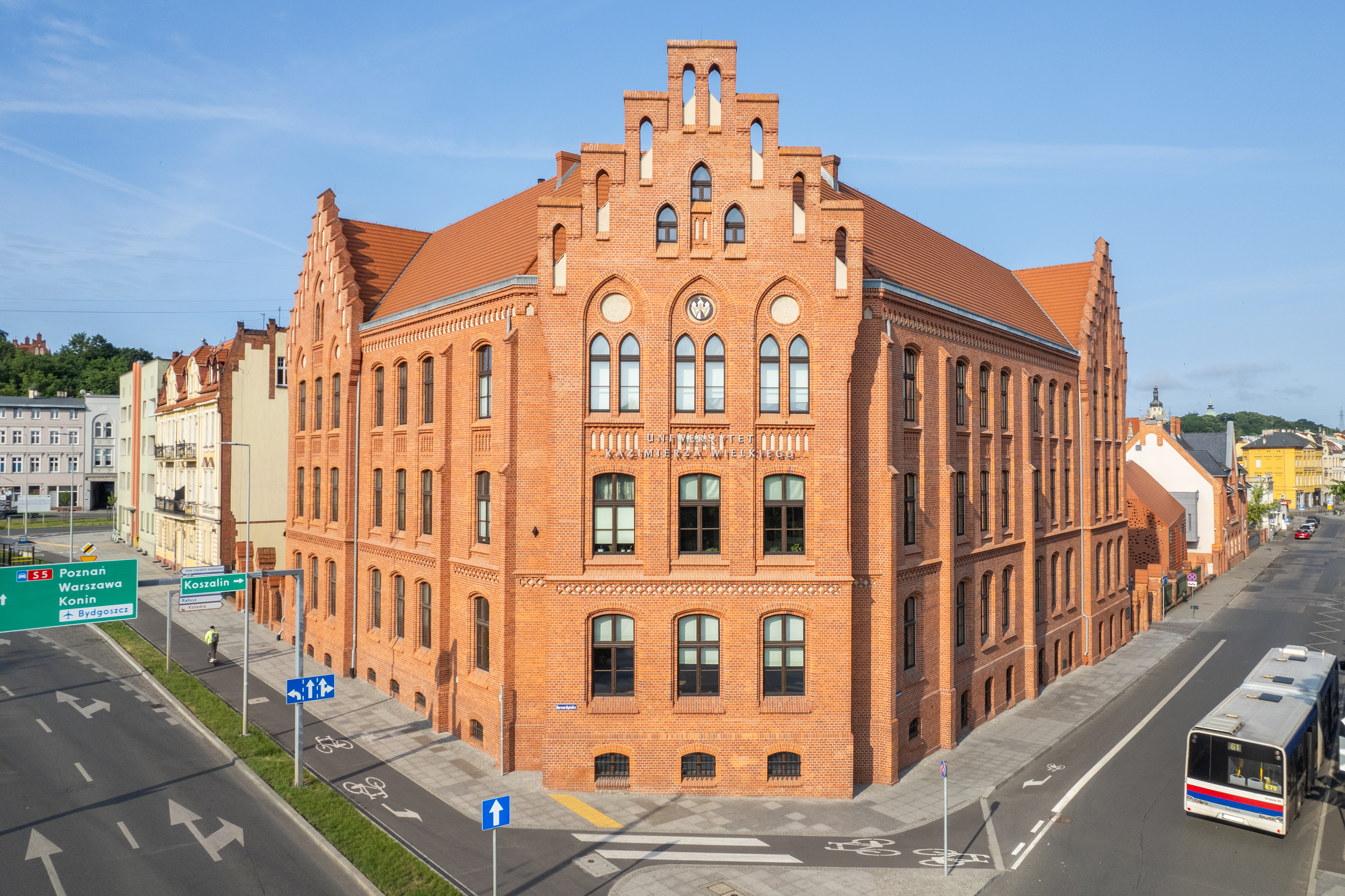
View from Bernardyńska Street

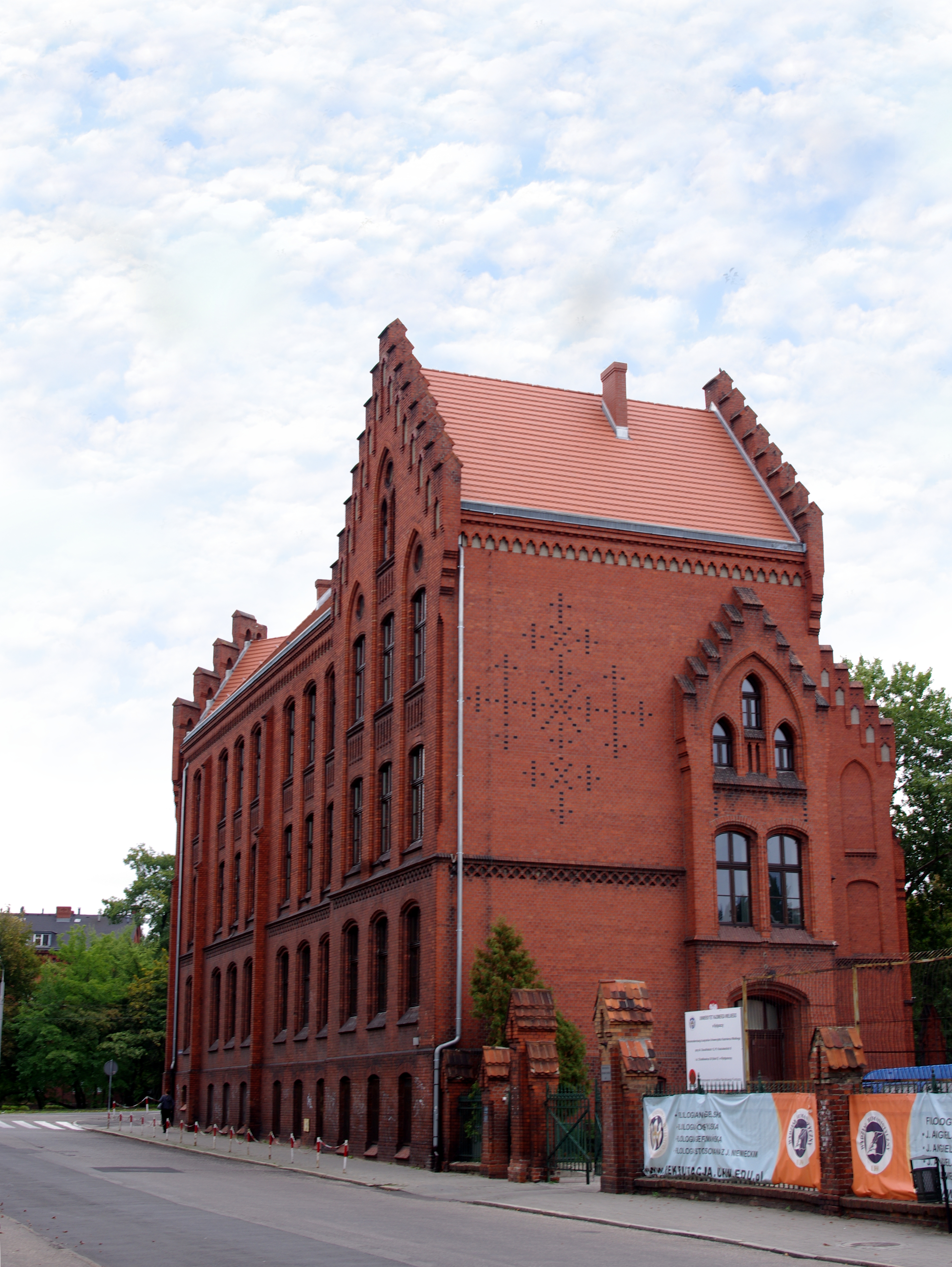
Wing on Kościeleckich square

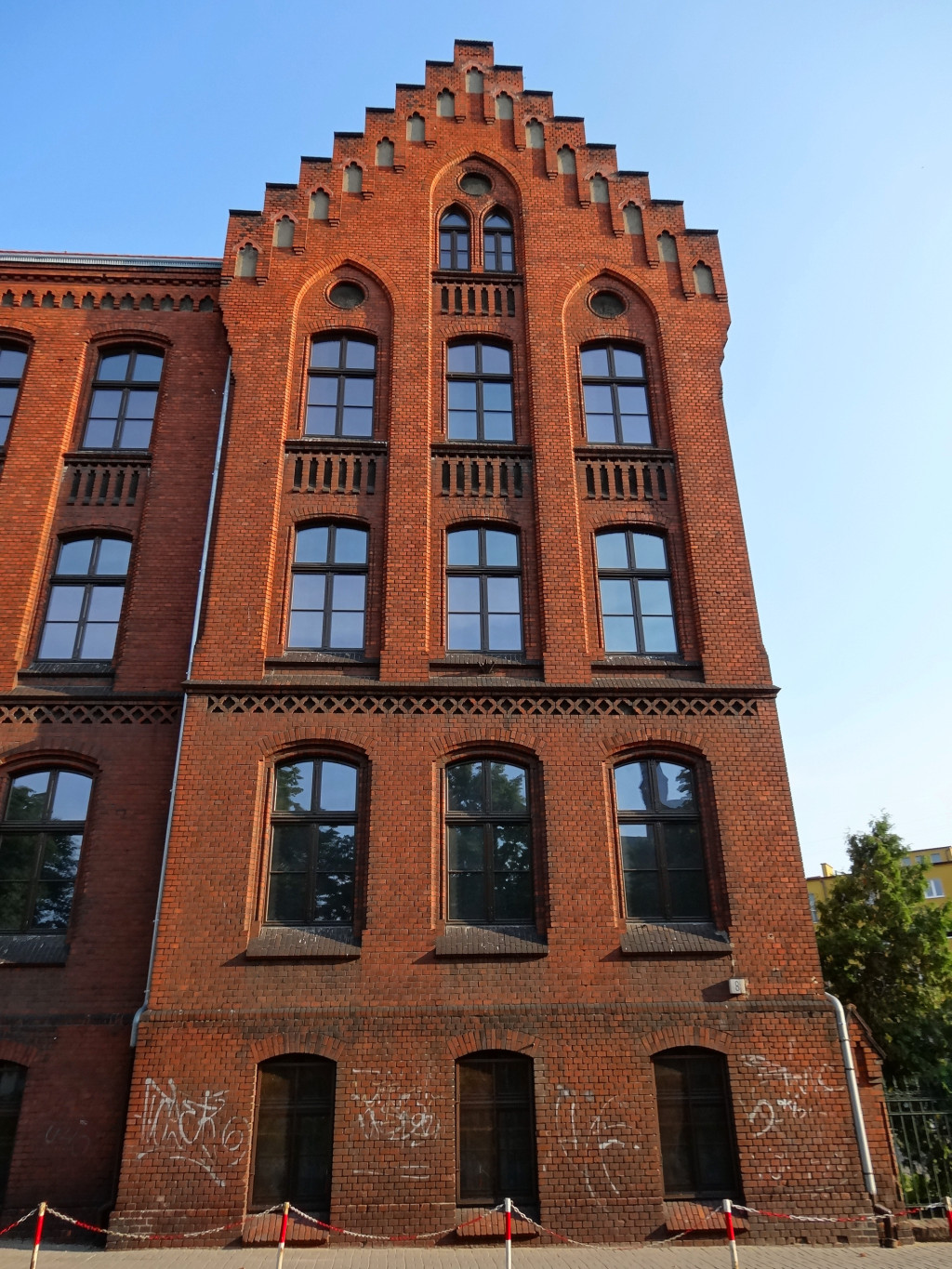
Detail of an avant-corps

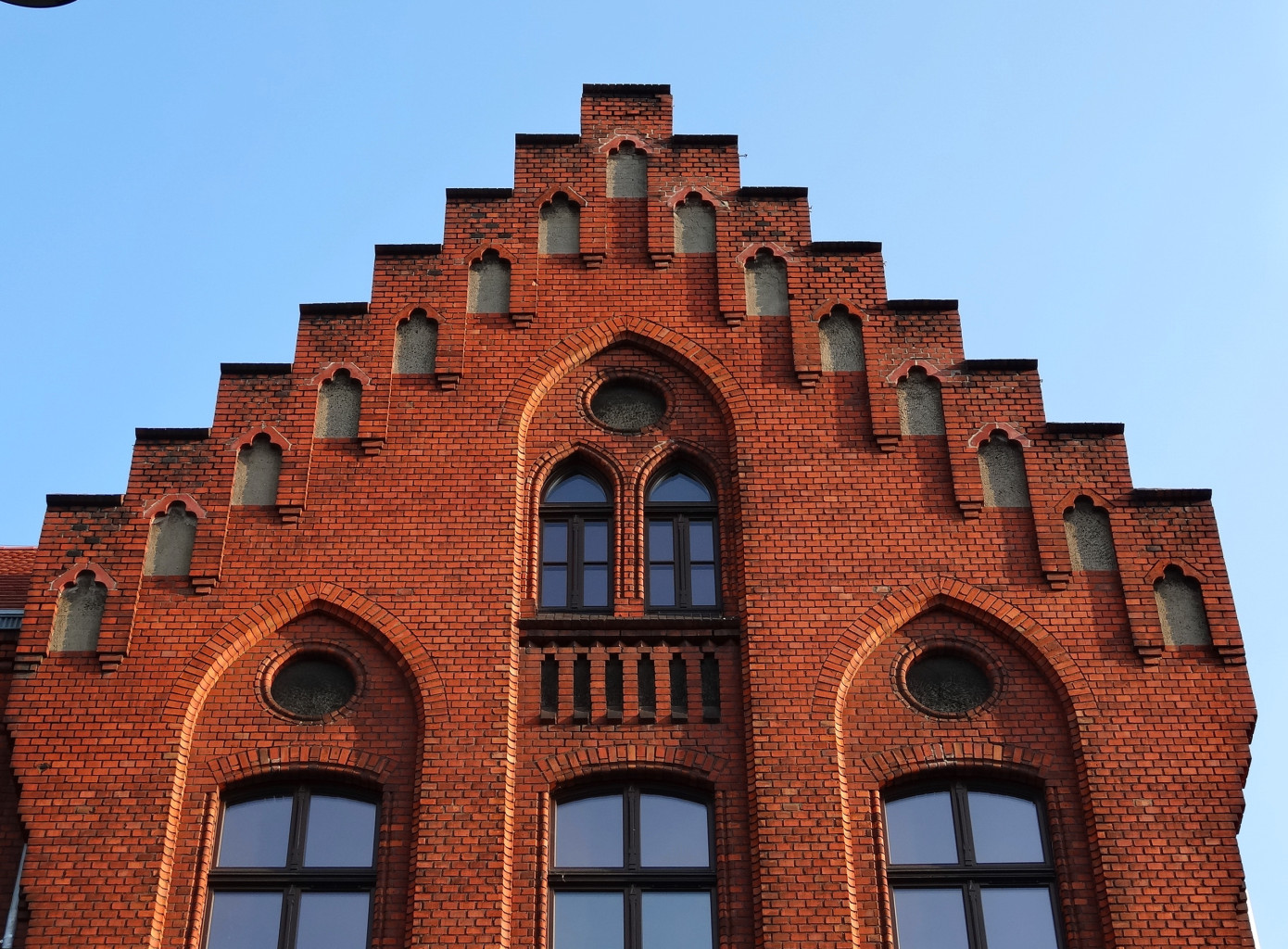
Detail of crow-stepped gable

=== Immobile K3 Building ===
The new building, started in spring 2016, has been completed by the beginning of 2018.

The square edifice has five storeys and a usable area of 9000 m^{2}: 6000 m^{2} for office space, 2400 m^{2} for retail and service locations, and 80 car parking lots. The project was led by the company CDI Konsultanci Budowlani Sp. z o. o.

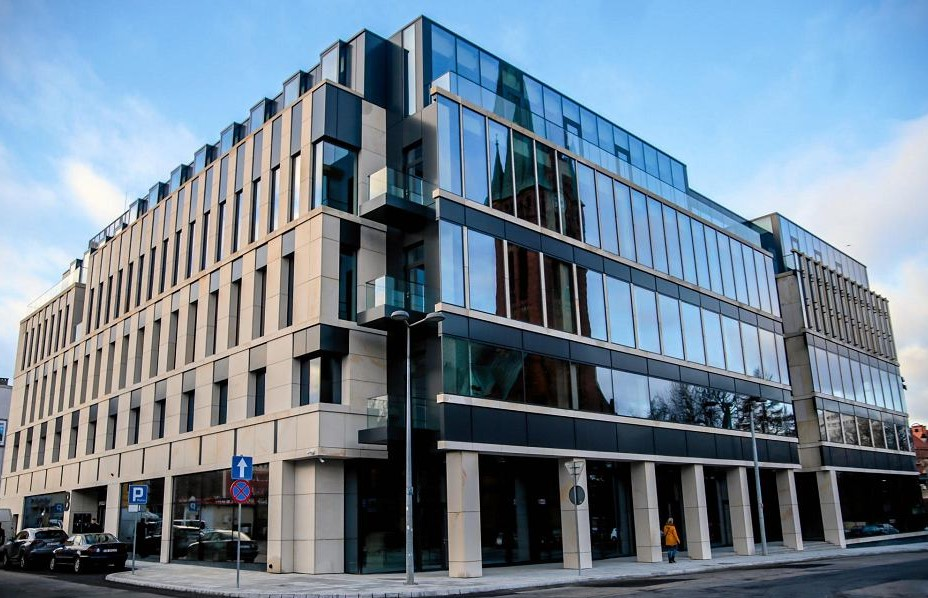
K3 corner view

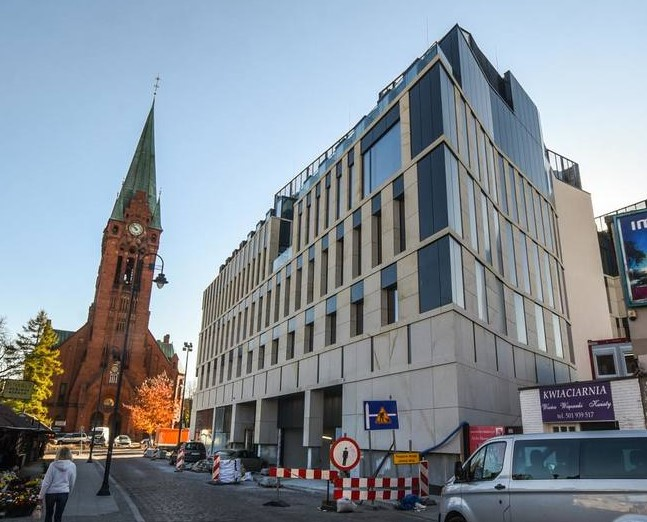
K3 with Saint Andrew Bobola's Church in the backdrop

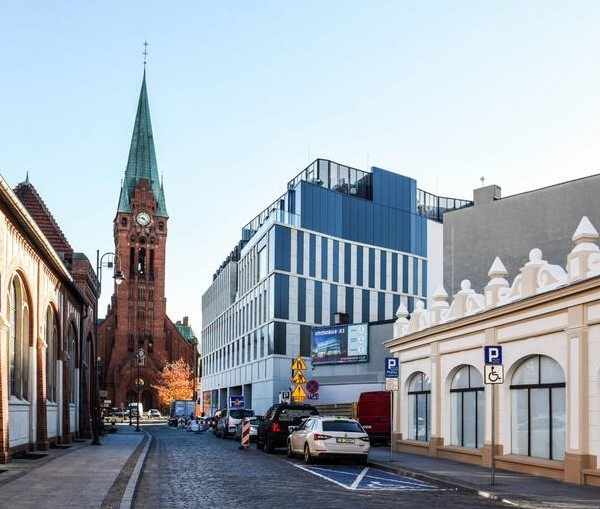
View from the Magdzińskiego Street

== See also ==
- Bydgoszcz
- Bydgoszcz Architects (1850-1970s)
- Hanover school of architecture

== Bibliography ==
- (in Polish) Czachorowski, Antoni (1997). Atlas historyczny miast polskich. Tom II Kujawy. Zeszyt 1. Bydgoszcz. Toruń: Uniwersytet Mikołaja Kopernika.
- (in Polish) Derenda, Jerzy (2006). Piękna stara Bydgoszcz – tom I z serii Bydgoszcz miasto na Kujawach. Bydgoszcz: Towarzystwo Miłośników Miasta Bydgoszczy.
- (in Polish) Umiński, Janusz (1996). Bydgoszcz. Przewodnik. Bydgoszcz: Regionalny Oddział PTTK „Szlak Brdy”.
