= Doktora Emila Warmińskiego street =

Street in Bydgoszcz, Poland

Coordinates: 53°07′37″N 18°00′02″E

Doktora Emila Warmińskiego street in Bydgoszcz street
Bydgoszcz
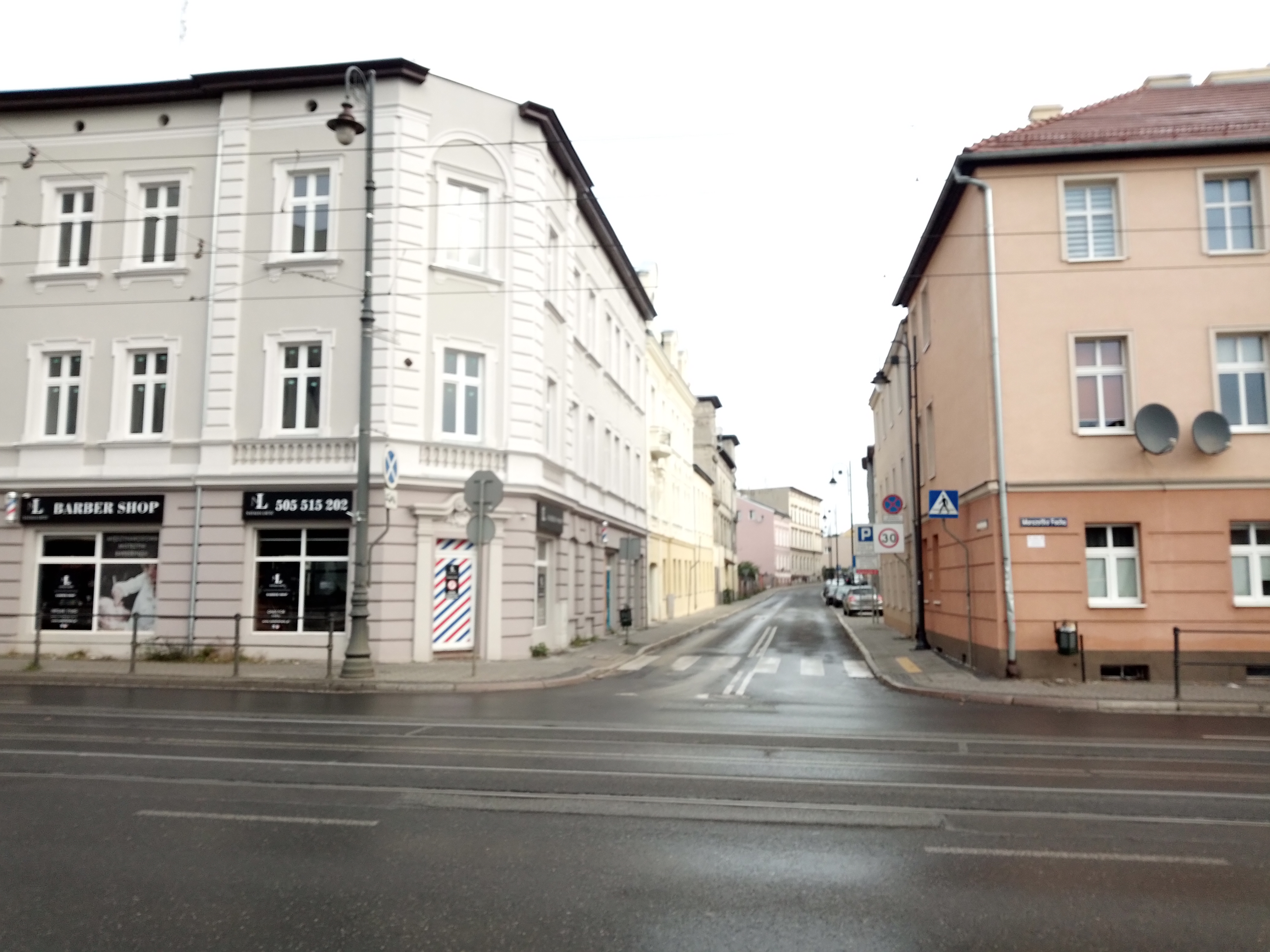
- View of the street from the south
- Interactive map of Doktora Emila Warmińskiego street in Bydgoszcz street
- Native name: Ulica Doktora Emila Warmińskiego w Bydgoszczy (Polish)
- Former names: Gamm Straße, Ulica Gamma
- Part of: Downtown district
- Namesake: Dr Emil Warmiński
- Owner: City of Bydgoszcz
- Length: 450 m (1,480 ft)
- Width: ca. 10m
- Location: Bydgoszcz, Poland

Construction
- Construction start: 1860s

Doktora Emila Warmińskiego street is an old street of the Bydgoszcz centre. Many buildings along this path carry historical interest in the framework of the development of the city.

== Location ==
The street is located in downtown district (Polish: Śródmiescie). Its course lies on a south–north axis, from Focha street to Zduny street, parallel to Gdańska Street. On its way, Warmińskiego street crosses the following axes: Obrońców Bydgoszczy, Dworcowa, Podolska and Zduny.

== History ==
The path that will become Warmińskiego street was laid during the second half of the 19th century, under Prussian rule. It stems from the growing activity along Focha street (then Wilhelmstraße) in the one hand and the set up of industries on the north of Focha street in the other hand.

Before its inception, facility along the street were registered under the neighbouring avenues already established, i.e. with Wilhelmstraße, Bahnofstraße or Petersonstraße numbering. A handful of tenements from this period are still standing.

Between the 1890s and the outset of the First World War, several firms set up in the area and contributed to the prominence of the street. One can mention, among others:

- a tram company and an electrical powerplant (German: Straßenbahngesellschaft Maschinenanlagen der Elektrizitätswerke) established in 1904 at Nr.8. One can still see hooks on rosettes (two at Nr.1 and one at Nr.3 and 5) that were used to support a traction network that carried coal to feed the power plant.
- a dairy workshop (German: Bromberger Molkerei) established in 1888 at Nr.9;
- a construction company (Polish: Społka budowlana) before WWI at Nr.11;
- an industrial machine workshop, later a printing house (German: Buchdruckerei) in the early 1880s at Nr.14;
- BEFANA factory set up in 1915 within the area between Warmińskiego street and Obrońców Bydgoszczy street, producing black tools (spades, axes, pickaxes...) and files;
- Polon, a light bulbs factory opened at Nr.15 in 1925.

After the war (1922), a large confectionery factory opened at Nr.7/9 and operated till the 1990s (Tyler Brothers factory).

In the late 2010s, a series of renovation of the buildings have taken place, especially in the vicinity of the opera on Focha street.

During the entire Prussian period (till 1920), the street had the same pattern as today. However, in 1920, the avenue was divided into two sections, north and south of Dworcowa street. Thus Warmińskiego street bore the following names through time:

- Till 1920, Gamm Straße, from the Gamm family who owned of a soap and candle factory located in the street in the 1850s;
- 1920–1939, Ulica Doktora Emila Warmińskiego (south) / Ulica Gamma (north);
- 1939–1945, Gamm Straße;
- Since 1945, Ulica Doktora Emila Warmińskiego on the entire length.

Current naming refers to Emil Warmiński (1881–1909), a doctor, Polish social and national activist, founder of the "Polish House" in this very street (then Gammstraße).

== Main areas and edifices ==
=== Tenement at 26 Focha street, corner with Warmińskiego street ===
1876, by Carl Stampehl

Eclecticism

Johann Kretschmer, a wood merchand, was the landlord of building at then Wilhelmstraße 7 (Nr.26). Carl Stampehl also designed in Bydgoszcz a tenement at 22 Gdanska street (1875) and the Villa Carl Blumwe in (1893).

Recently refurbished, the tenement displays modest features.

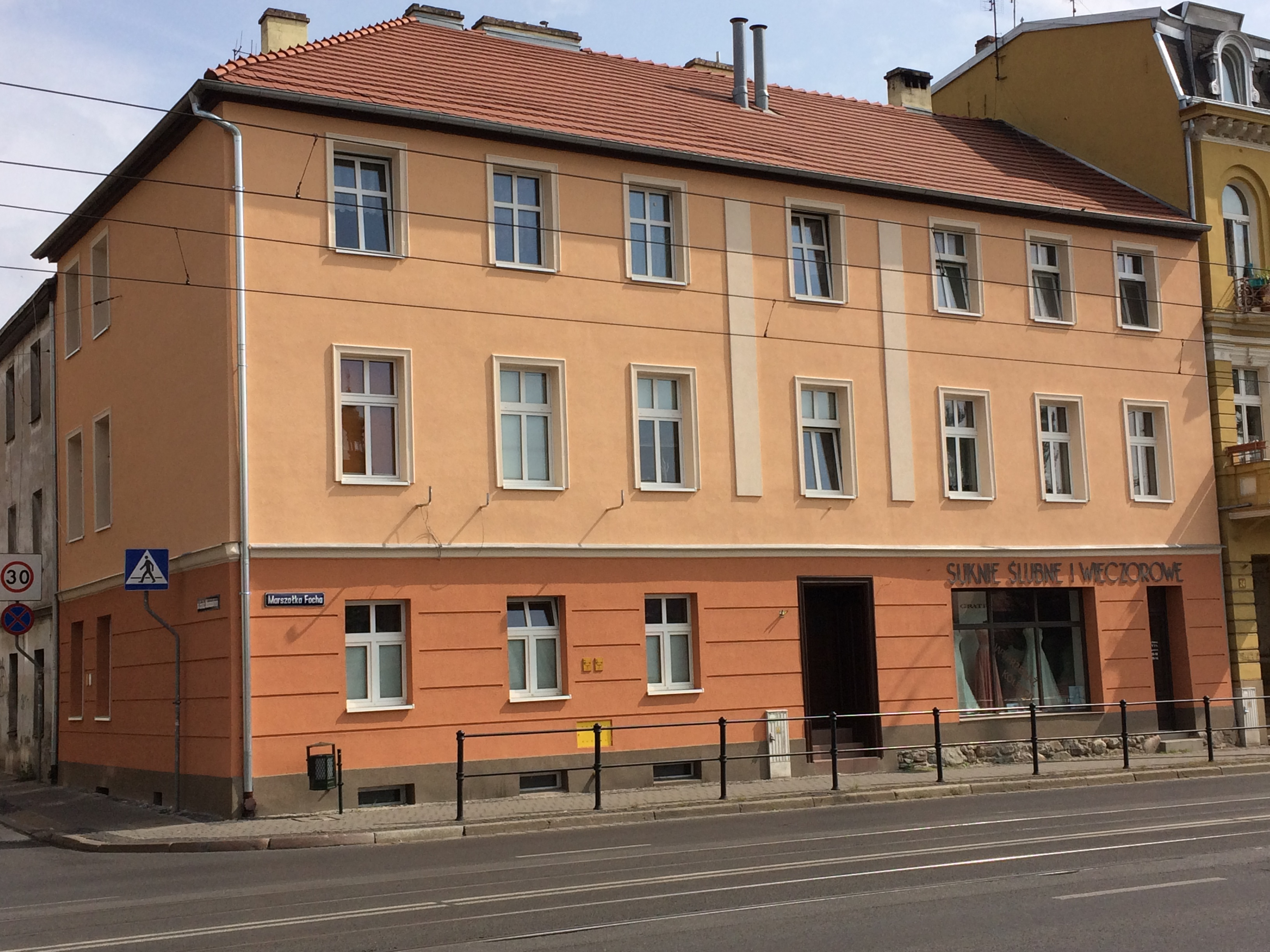
View from Focha street

=== Tenement at 28 Focha street, corner with 1 Warmińskiego street ===
1896–1897

Eclecticism with Art Nouveau elements

The commissioner and first landlord was Hugo Rossow, a restaurateur running a pub house (German: Gesellschaftshaus). The building has been referenced for a long time at 6 Wilhelmstraße.

Thoroughly refurbished in 2020, after being in a poor state for many years, the building boasts, among others, bas-reliefs, cornices, bossage elements on the ground floor and a portal with pillar strips topped by a balustrade line.

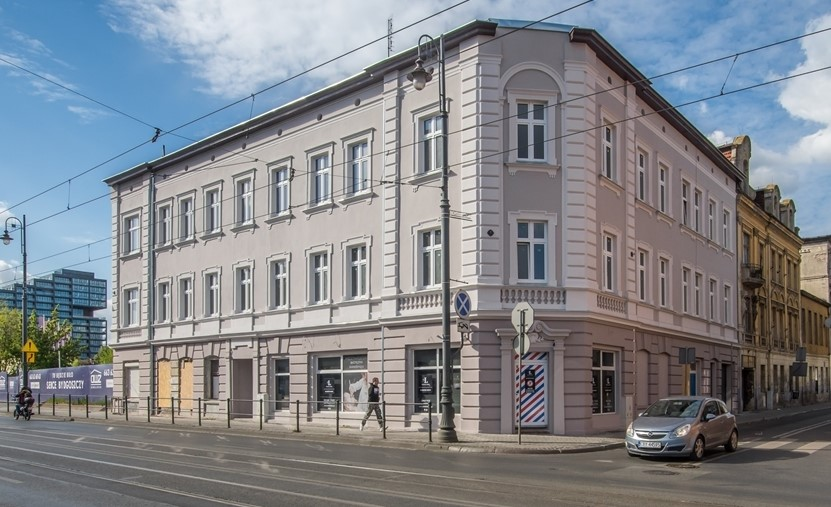
View of the tenement from Focha street

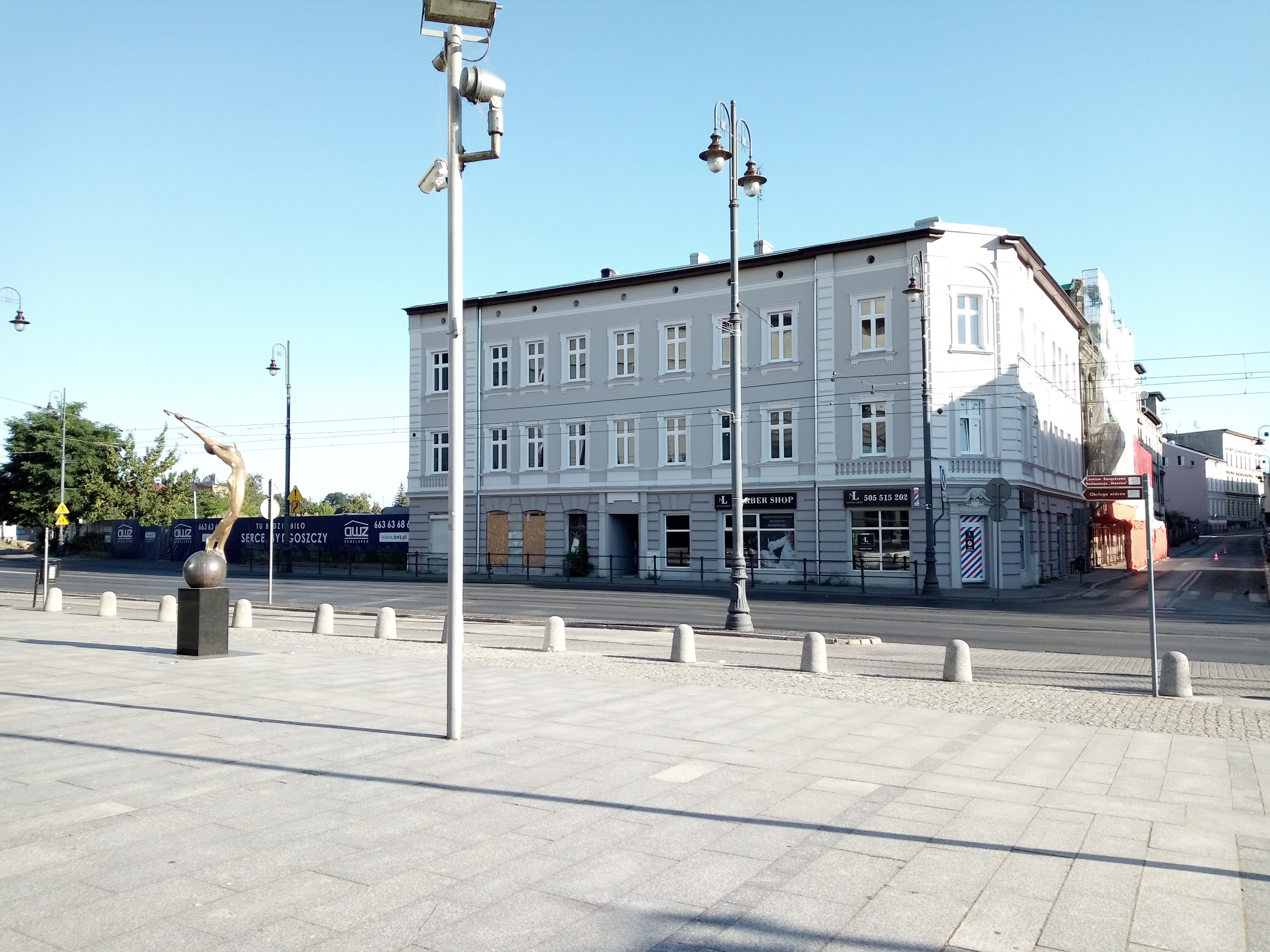
Elevation at 28-view from the opera

=== Tenement at 3 ===
1850–1875

Eclecticism with Art Nouveau elements

The first registered landlord was Friedrich ßetrich, a blacksmith by trade who set up a workshop producing wagons in the late 1860s. From the beginning of the 20th century till the outset of WWI, a restaurant owned and run by Franz Rüdiger was located there.

A deep renovation occurred in 2020. The facade highlights now its assets: female-figure caryatids stand on both sides of the window above the gateway, supporting an elegant semicircular balcony. The ground floor is stone rusticated and the individual storeys are separated by cornices. A corbel table has been integrated under the three-sided tiled roof, which displays dormers. The elevation is also decorated with elaborate window frames, pilasters and an elaborated portal.

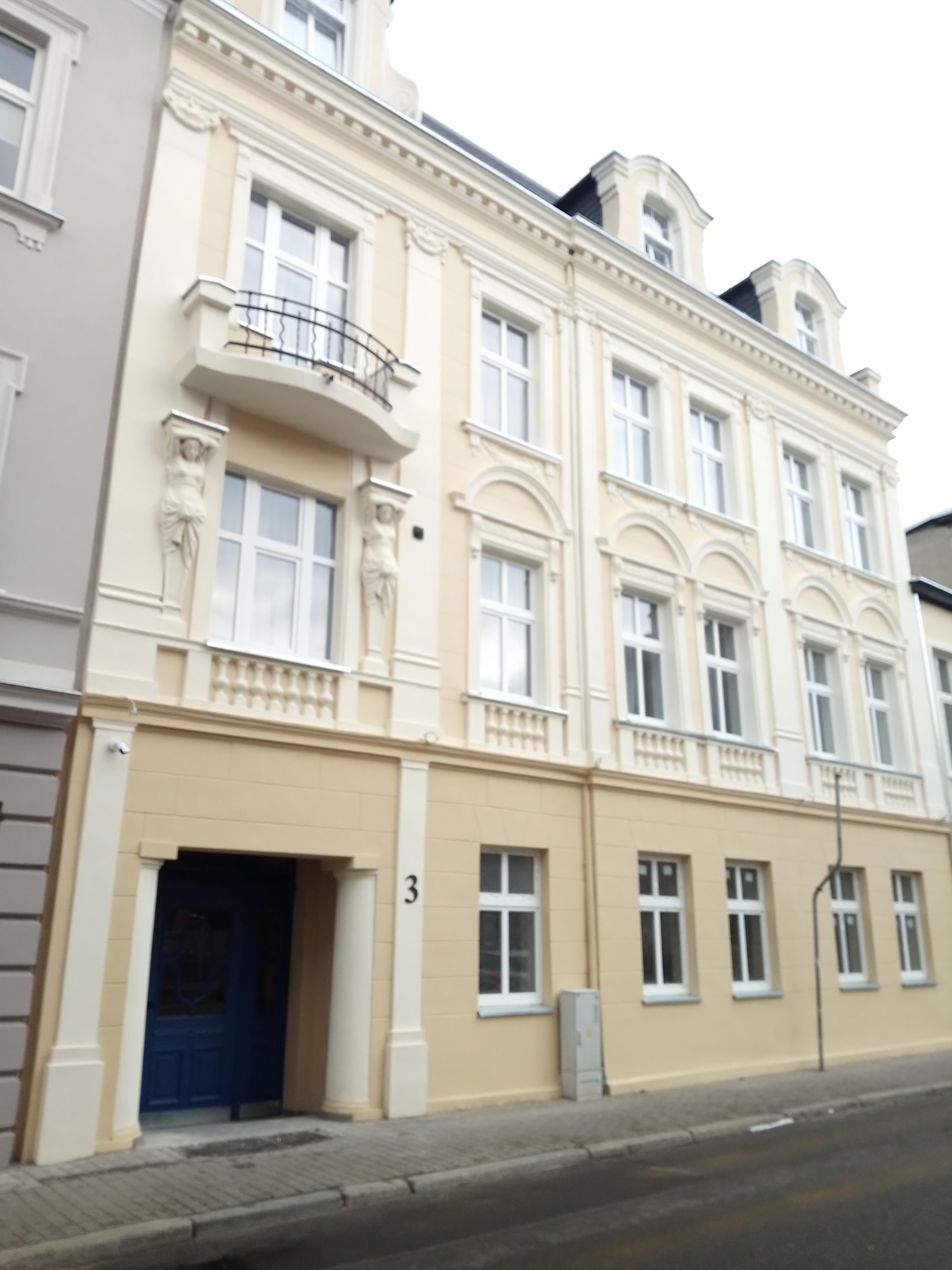
Frontage from the street

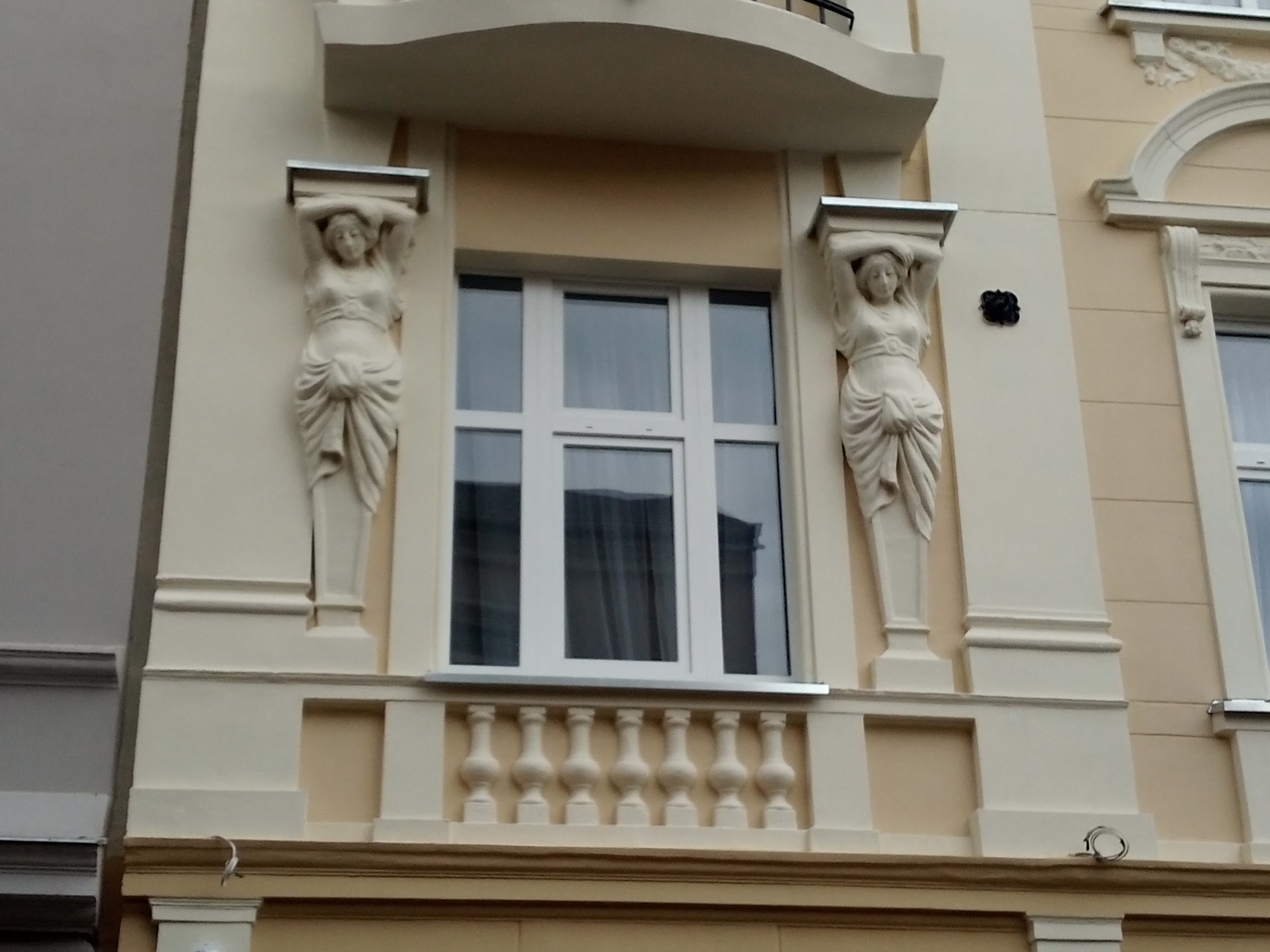
Caryatids with one hook on rosette

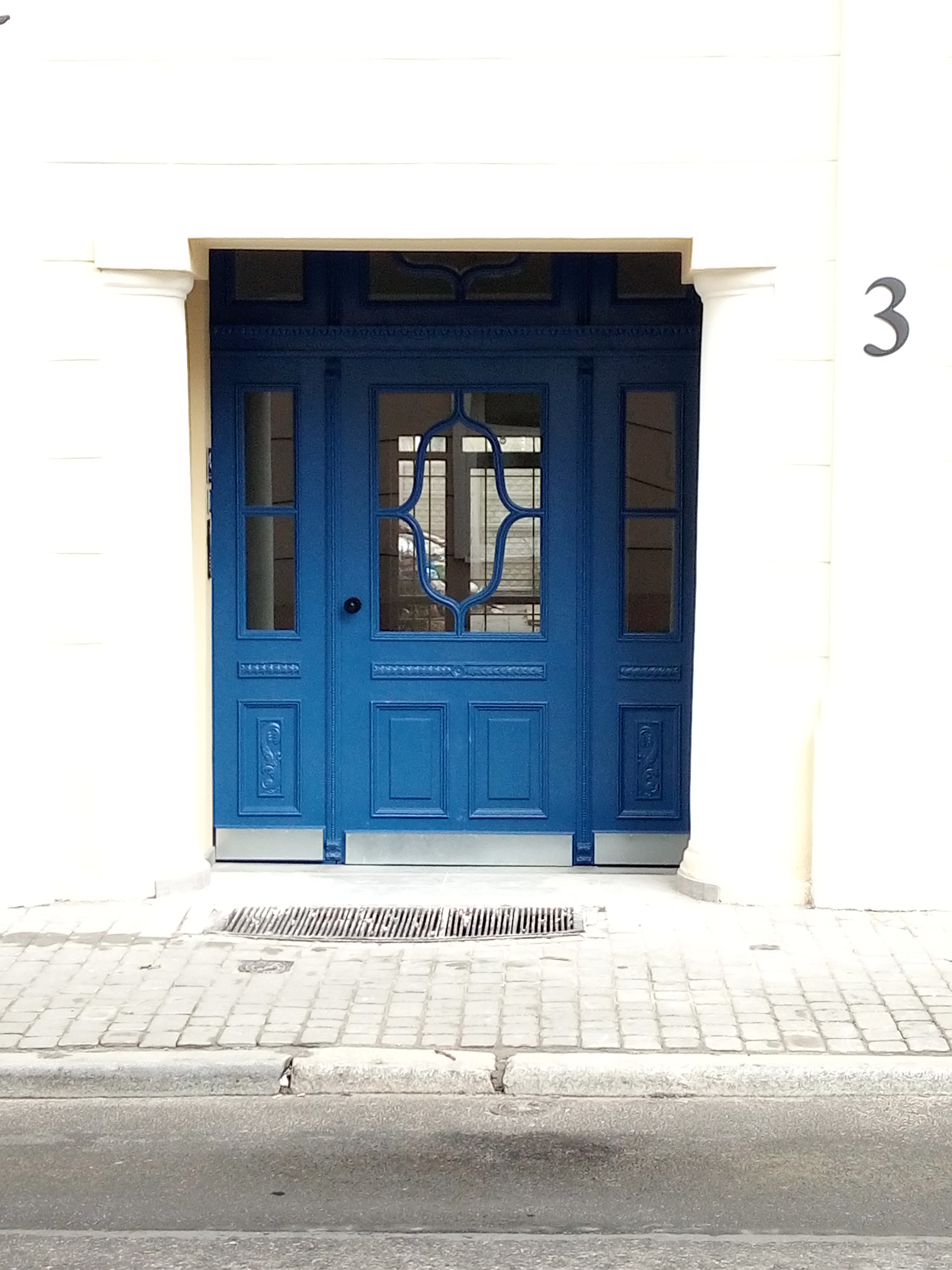
Portal and door

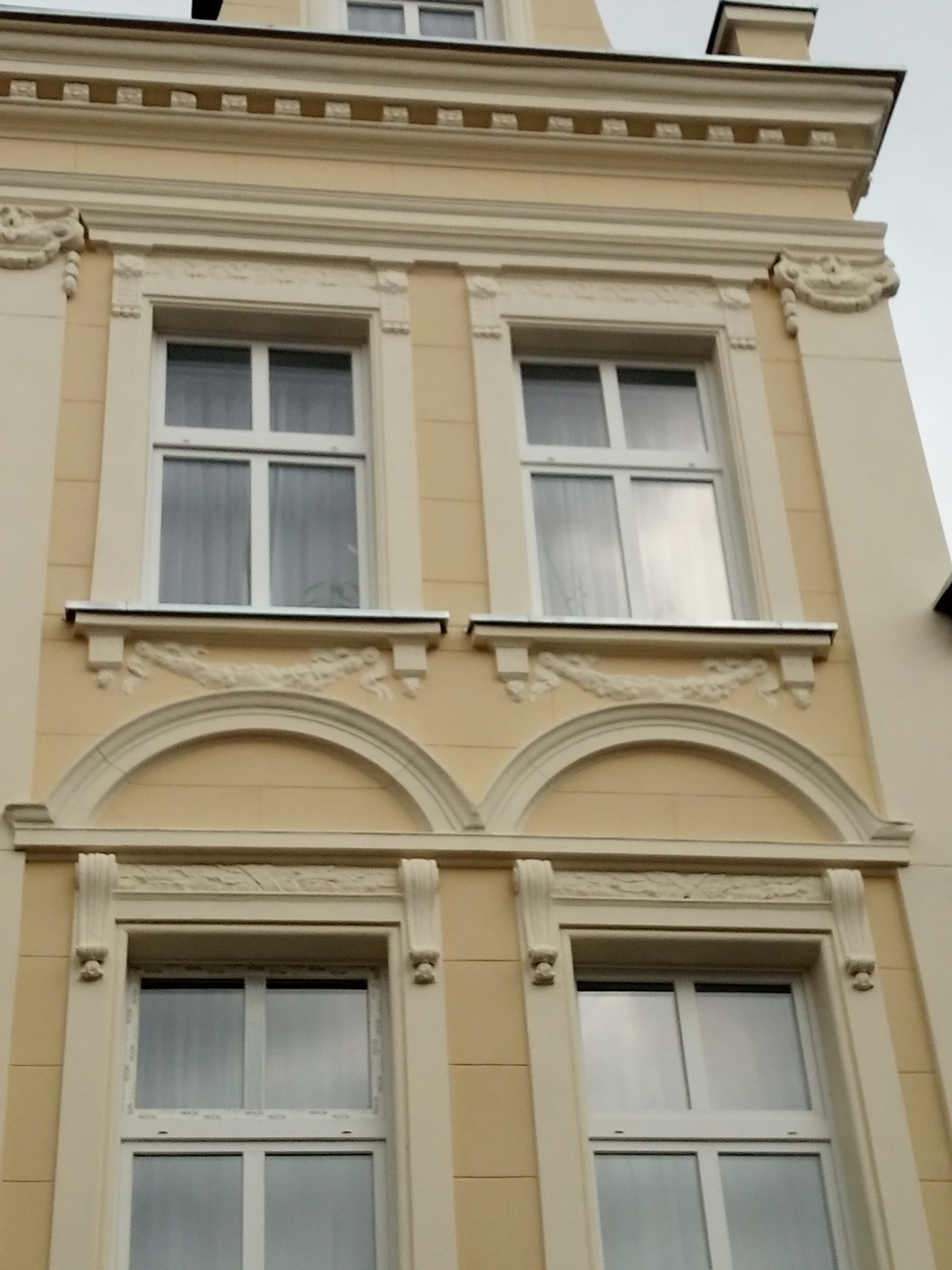
Adorned windows

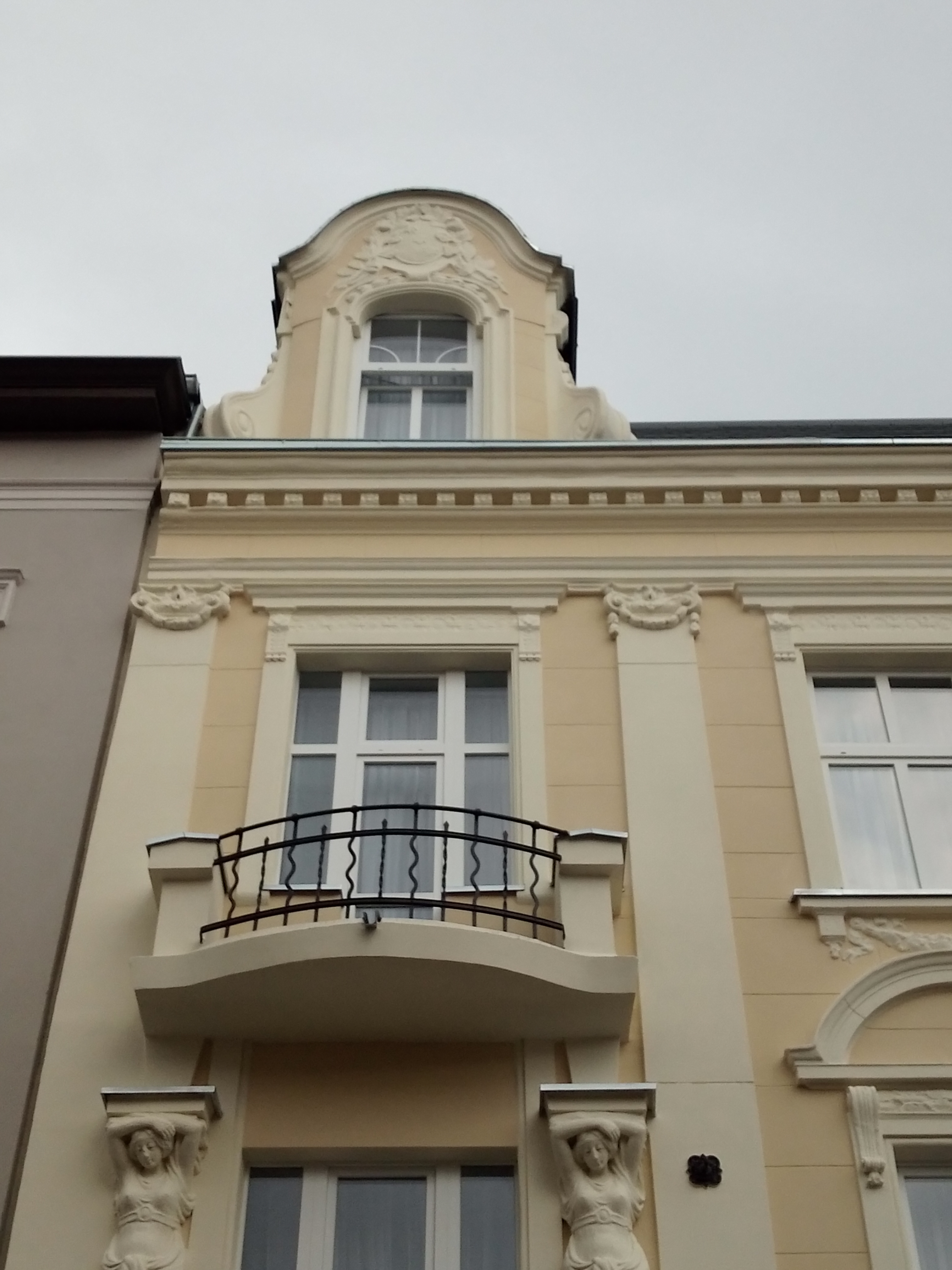
View of the facade balcony

=== Tenement at 4 ===
1938–1939

Modern Architecture

This building is an additional and accurate instance of Polish modernism of the interwar period, together with many other tenements in downtown Bydgoszcz:

- 9 and 41 20 Stycznia 1920 Street;
- 7 Plac Wolności;
- 14 Kopernika Street;
- 11 Ossoliński avenue.
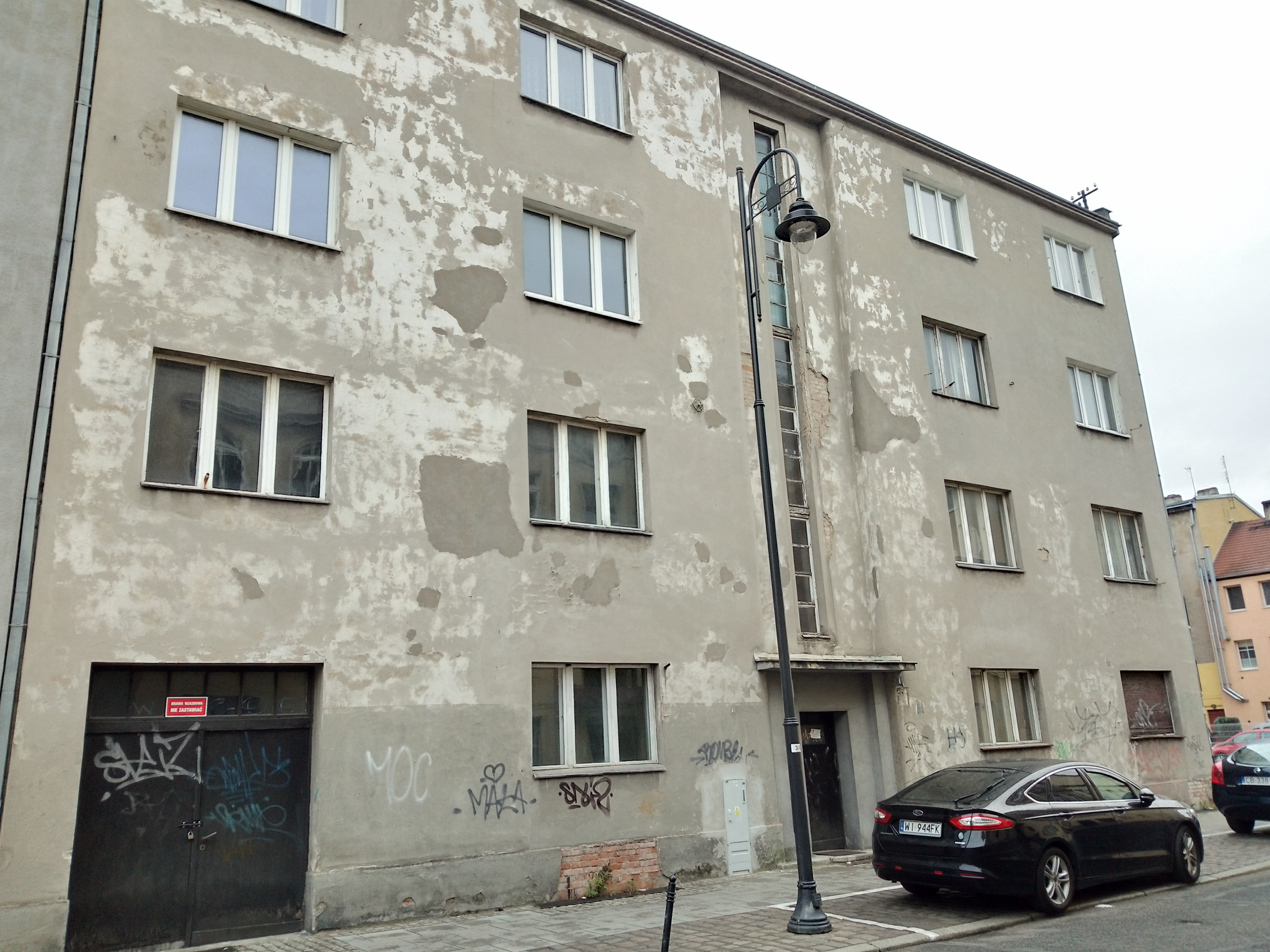
Elevation on the street

=== Tenement at 5 ===
1850–1875

Eclecticism

The house is mentioned in 1872, as the place housing the workshop of Friedrich ßetrich, a blacksmith living at Nr.3. From the 1880s onwards, the expanded building was used as a renting tenement owned by Leue & Kretschmer, later (1885) landlords of tenements at 1,2,4 and 5 Gamm Straße (today's Nr.1 to 5) till the start of WWI.

The facade, stripped of any decoration, still exhibits a balanced ensemble. One can notice the quirky entrance door, topped by a thin tiled roof and a French window giving on a wrought iron railing.

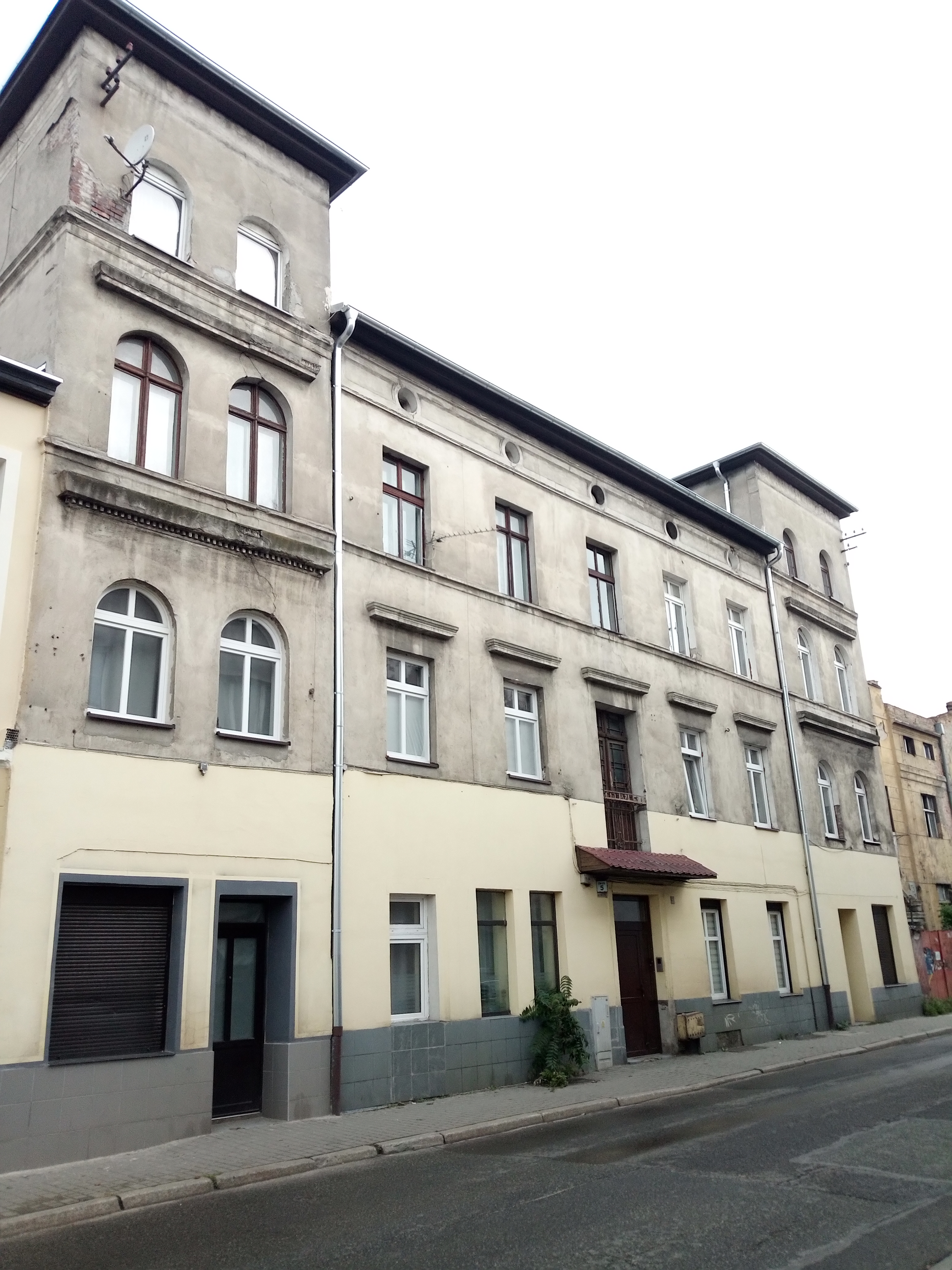
Main frontage on the street

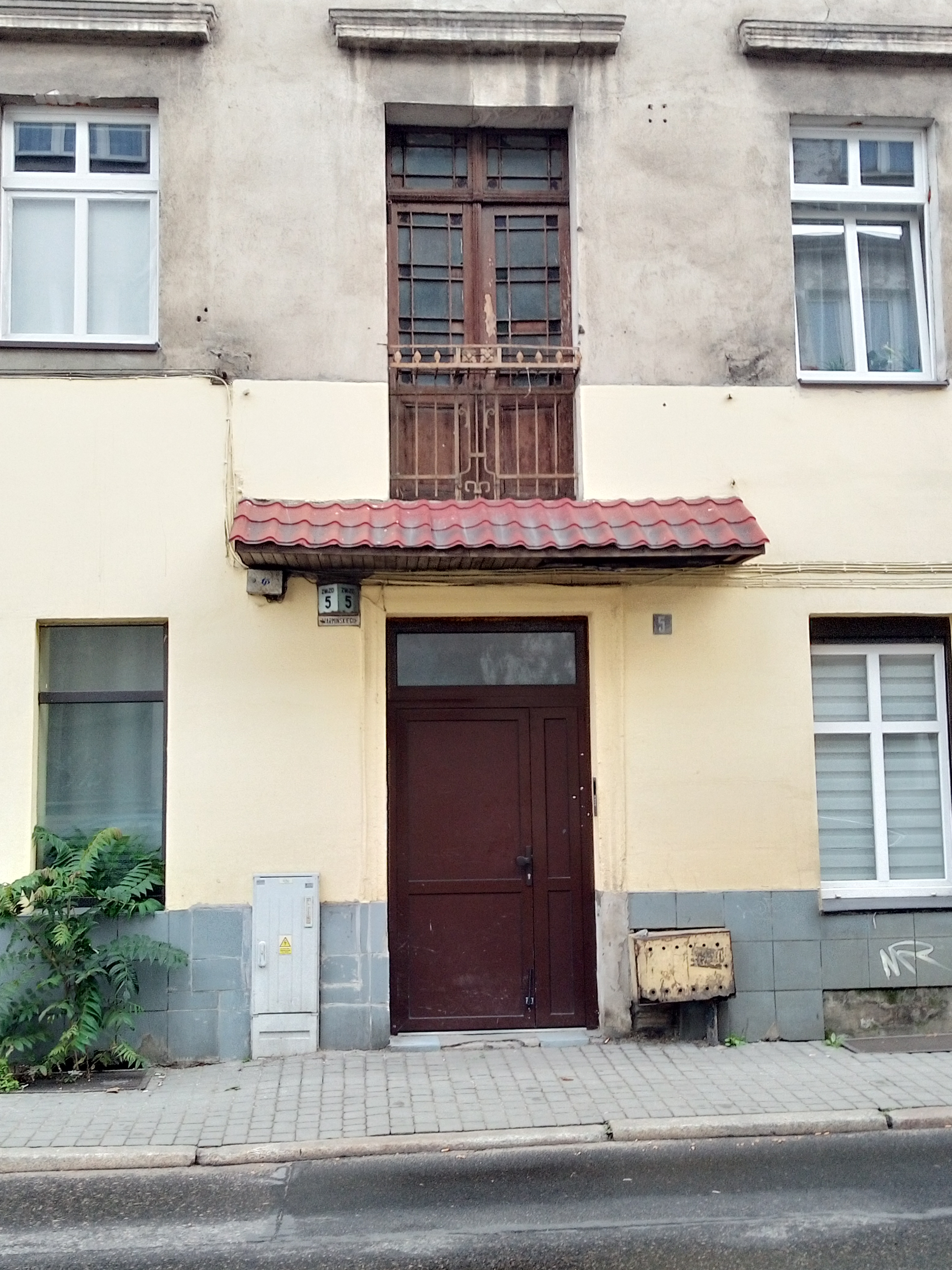
Main gateway and French window

=== Former Tysler brothers factory at 7/9 ===
09–1910

Industrial architecture

Initially on the place stood a dairy house, the Bromberger Molkerei, designed by Józef Święcicki, which operated till the end of the WWI.

In 1922, the Tysler brothers had a confectionery factory built there: it operated under the name Fabryka Cukrów i Czekolady. During World War II, the plant was taken over by the Germans, but kept producing. In 1945, Tysler Brothers business was nationalized as Jutrzenka company (English: Morning star). Four years later the company was merged into a conglomerate, the Pomeranian United Sugar and Chocolate Factories. In 1950, the latter was combined with other factories: the ex-Lucullus at 5 Garbary Street and a biscuit factory for the army at 53 Kościuszki street. In 1951, the company was re-branded Zakłady Przemysłu Cukierniczego Jutrzenka (English: Jutrzenka Confectionery Plant). In 1994, the firm was privatized: under the umbrella of the Colian Holding, it entered the Warsaw Stock Exchange as Jutrzenka Holding S.A. ten years later.

The production site in Warmińskiego street closed in 1995, due to the nuisance to the environment, the plant being located in a densely built-up residential center of Bydgoszcz. The plot, together with the abutting one of the former factory BEFANA at 13 Obrońców Bydgoszczy street, is part of a large real estate project called Nowy Port: works will begin at the beginning of 2021.

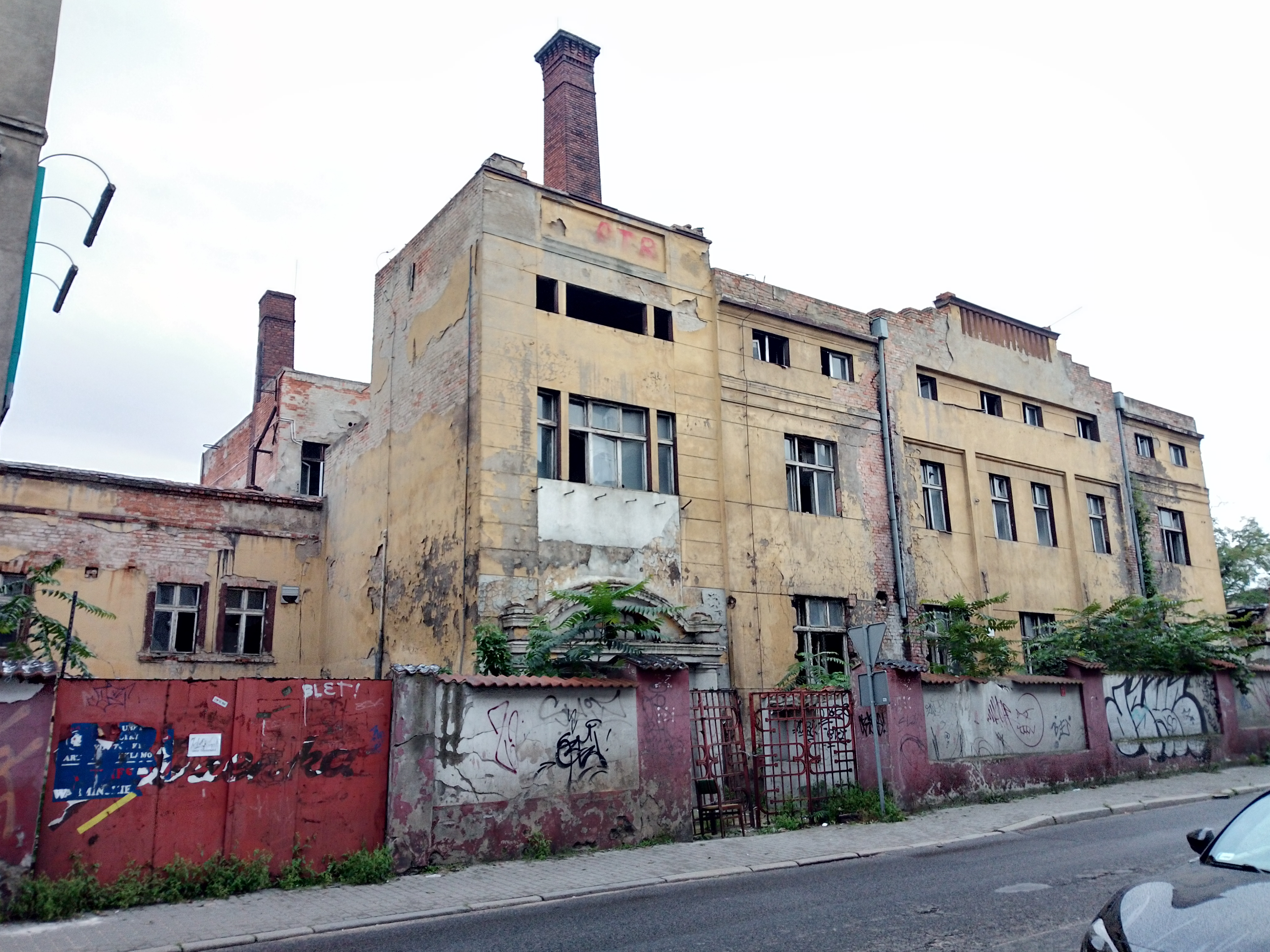
Main building view from the street

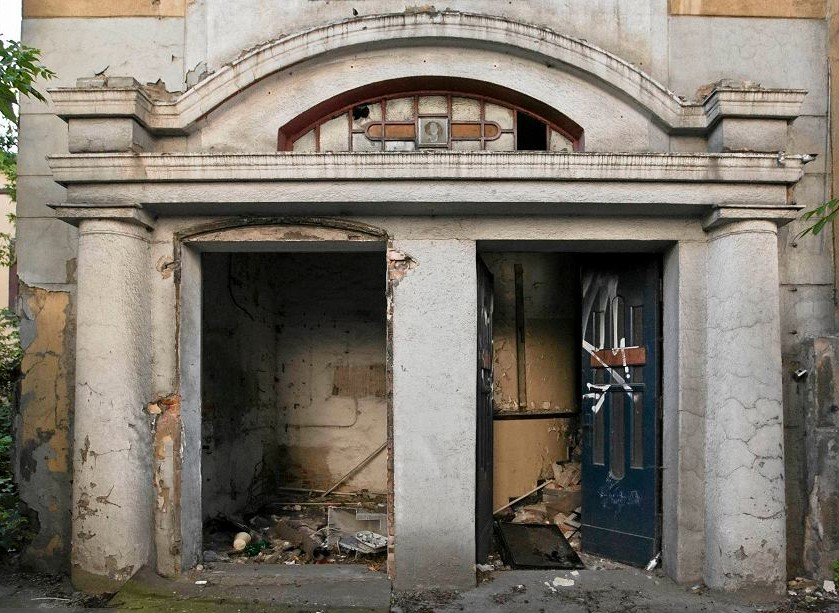
Portal

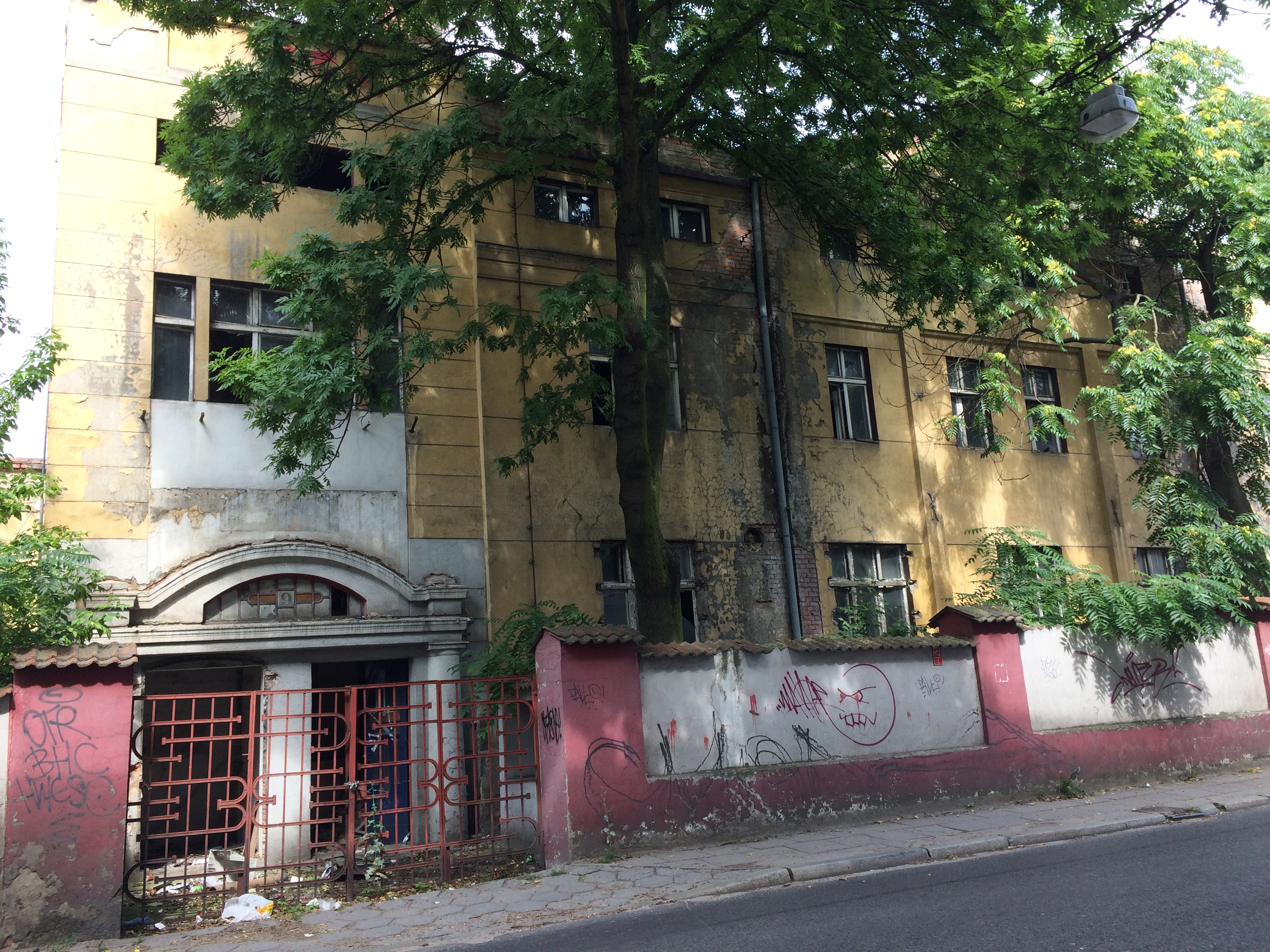
Frontage on the street

=== Tenement at 8 ===
Post WWII

Modern architecture

The first was house built in the 19th century: the architect Józef Święcicki and his family moved there a tenants from 1888 til 1890. In 1905, on an abutting plot, a power plant for street car production was erected by General tram company in Berlin (German: Der allgemeine und lokal und straßenbahngesellschaft in Berlin). Still operative after WWI, the company dropped down the tram manufacturing and maintained only the electrical power station in the late 1920s. Until 1946, the tracks enabling the access of freight trams to the former power plant were still visible. The only preserved elements are the hooks on the facades of some buildings in the street.

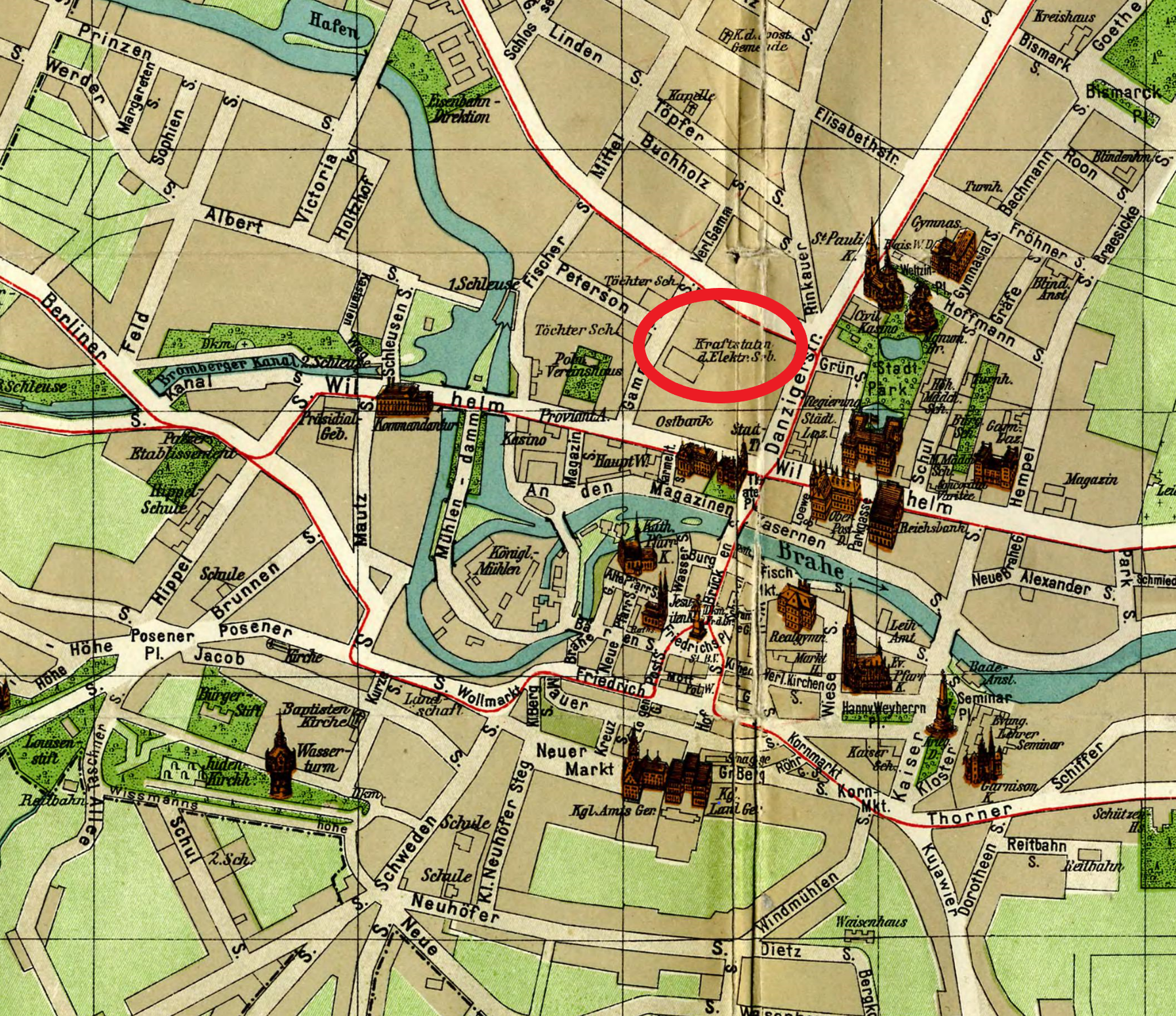
Power plant highlighted on a 1908 map of Bydgoszcz

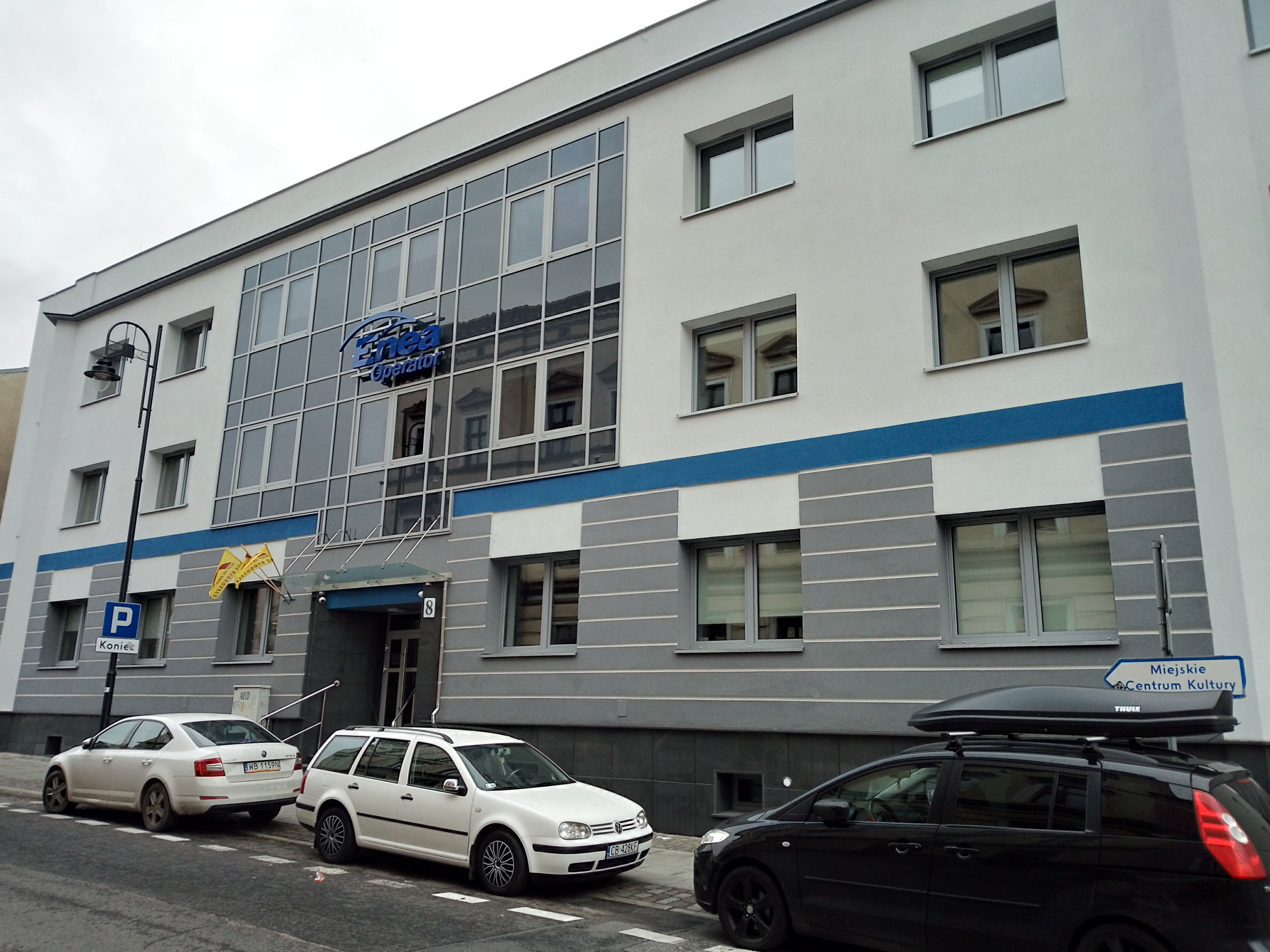
Building ENEA at Nr.8

=== Tenement at 10 ===
1850–1875

Eclecticism

First registered landlord was Louis Bauer, a music teacher. Today, it hosts the local seat of the Polish Red Cross.

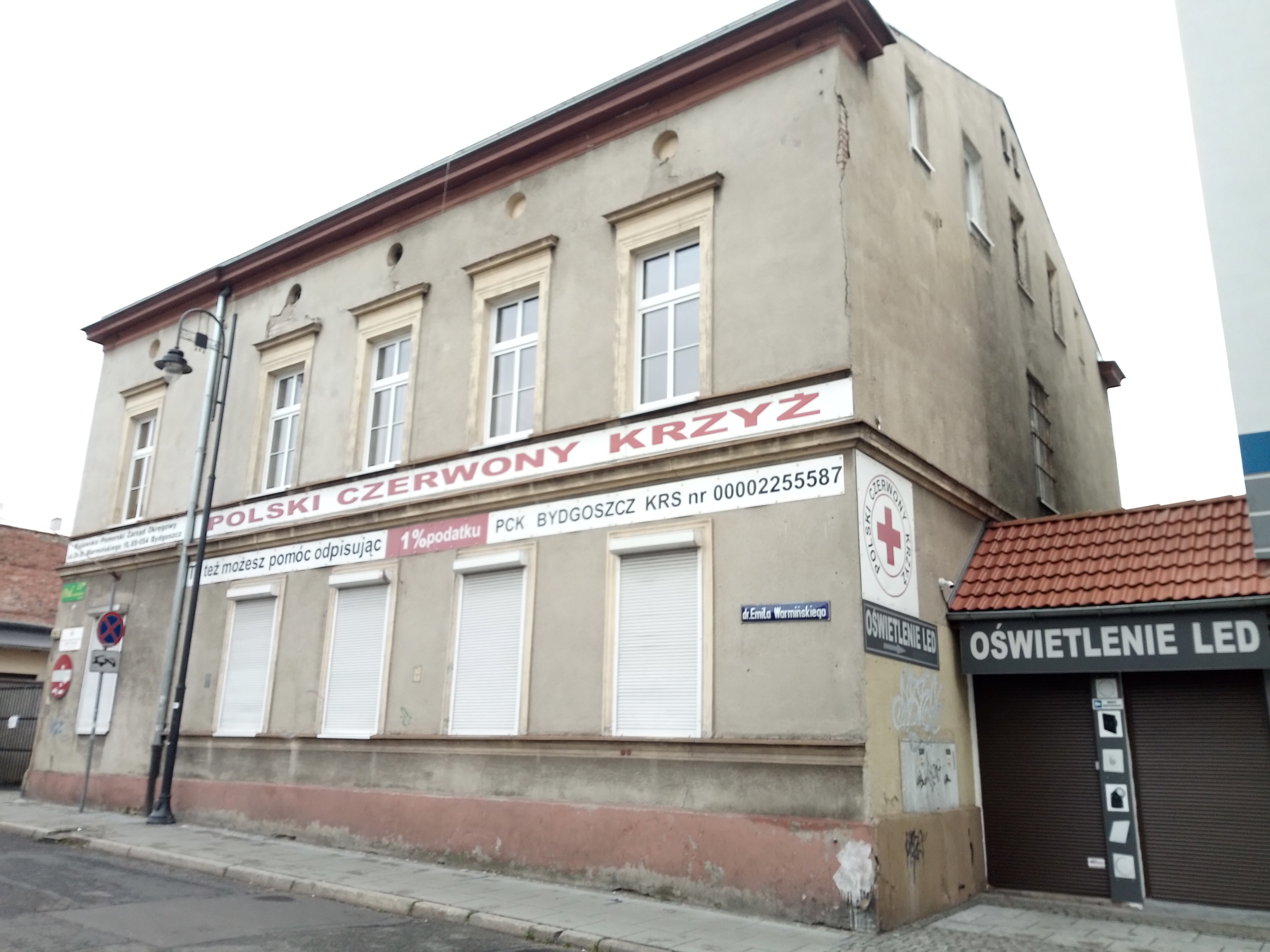
View from the street

=== Tenement at 11 ===
1850–1875

Neoclassical architecture

The first owner at then 6 Wilhelmstraße recorded in the early 1860s was Gottlieb Müller, working in the railway business. The house at Nr.11 still stands today.

In 1903, three social activists (Dr. Emil Warmiński, Dr. Władysława Piórka and Ludwik Sosnowski) established a building company which then purchased a large property with access on both 5 Wilhelmstraße (today 30 Focha st.30) and 6 Gamm straße (today 11 Warmińskiego st.). The ensemble built there had two rooms, a large garden with a summer stage and a place for gymnastic exercises. Social organizations operated at this Dom Polski (e.g. the Sokół Gymnastic Society or Halka Singing Society in Bydgoszcz), in addition to lectures and courses. In 1910, the Bydgoszcz Industrial Exhibition took place there. The local branch of the Grenzschutz (a paramilitary voluntary formation) attacked the Polish House and severely damaged it in August 1919.

After WWI, a metal products factory called Fema started to operate in the buildings of the former Dom Polski (1921), producing various types of furniture, locks, belt hinges, etc. Kazimierz and Edmund Sokolowski, firm's owners, placed a commemorative plaque in honor of the defunct Polish House on the wall of the factory at 11 Warmińskiego street. The board was destroyed by the Nazis: in 1958, for the 75th anniversary of its foundation, the “Halka” Singing Society of Bydgoszcz re-placed it, on a building in the back of the street. At the time, the nationalized factory called Bydgoska Fabryka Wyrobów Rowerowych Fema was one of several plants in Bydgoszcz manufacturing cheap bicycles for the entire nation. After the fall of communism, the main edifice became a car workshop and was eventually demolished in February 2019, as part of a real estate project. However, the commemorative plaque to Emil Warmiński will be positioned back on the plot at the end of the works.

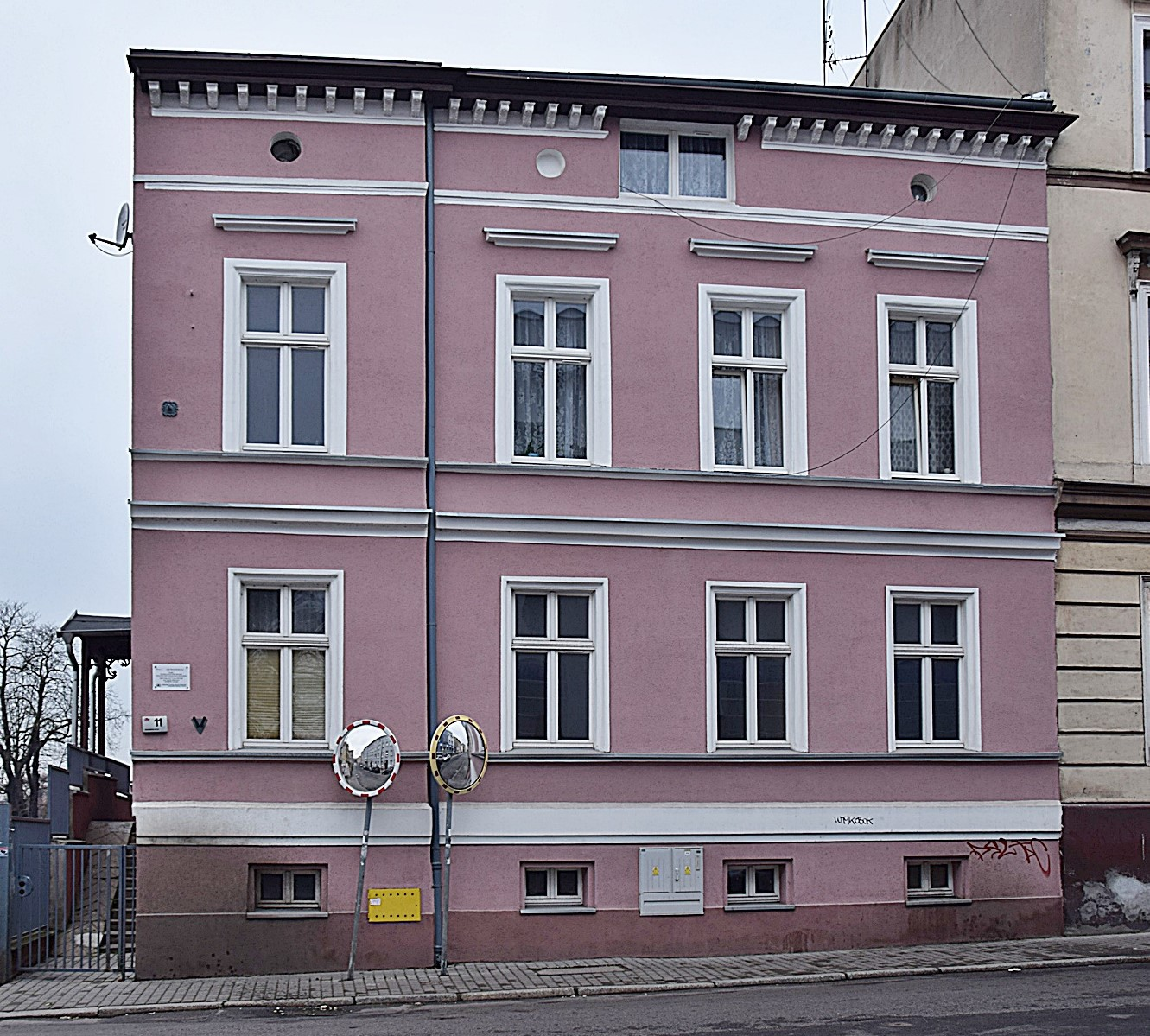
Current building view from the street

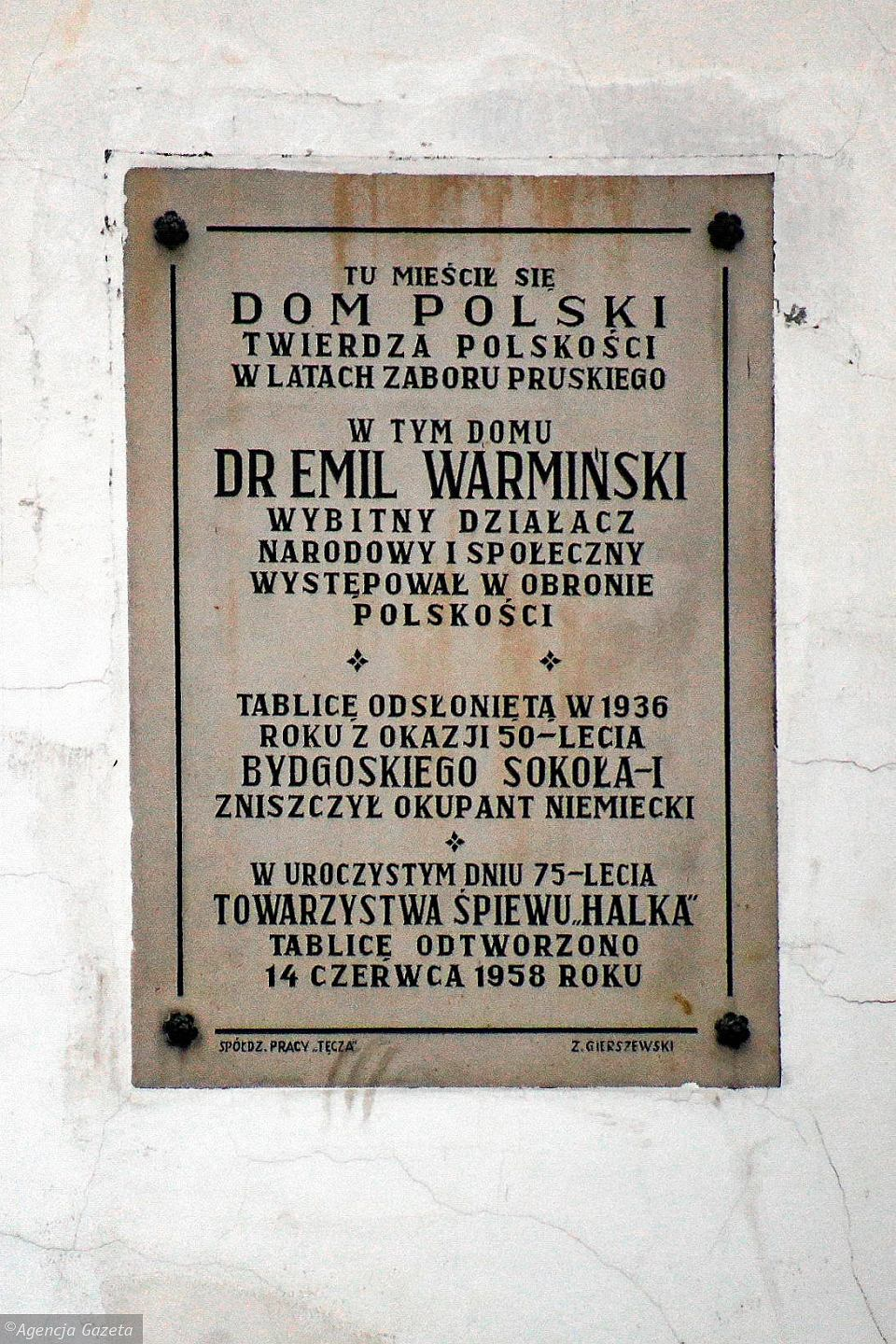
Emil Warminski plaque

=== Tenement at 1 Obrońców Bydgoszczy street, corner with Warmińskiego street ===
1884–1885

Eclecticism

The building has been one of the first erected in Obrońców Bydgoszczy street under Prussian rule, initially to house a private high school for girls (German: Höhere Töchterschule), then registered at 9 Gammstraße. In the 1910s, the school received the namesake of (Margarete) Dreger, one of its headmistress and was later called Dregersche Schule. After the re-creation of the Polish state, the private high school kept working, for girls and boys, under the same appellation: Priwatne Liceum im. Drögera. After the Second World War, the edifice lodged municipal Psychological and Pedagogical establishment Nr.1 (Polish: Poradnia Psychologiczno-Pedagogiczna). The institution moved out in the 2010s, and the ensemble has been proposed for selling to private owners by the city authorities in 2017. The intent is to set up here various activities including a Social Services Center and a nursery.

The edifice comprises three buildings displaying various styles, the lowest one being the former school gymnasium. The tenement standing at street corner has the most elaborated facades, with eclectic features: sleek bossage on the ground floor, windows topped by heavy lintels on the first floor and triangular pediments on the second, belt courses separating each level and a simple corbel table crowning the elevation.

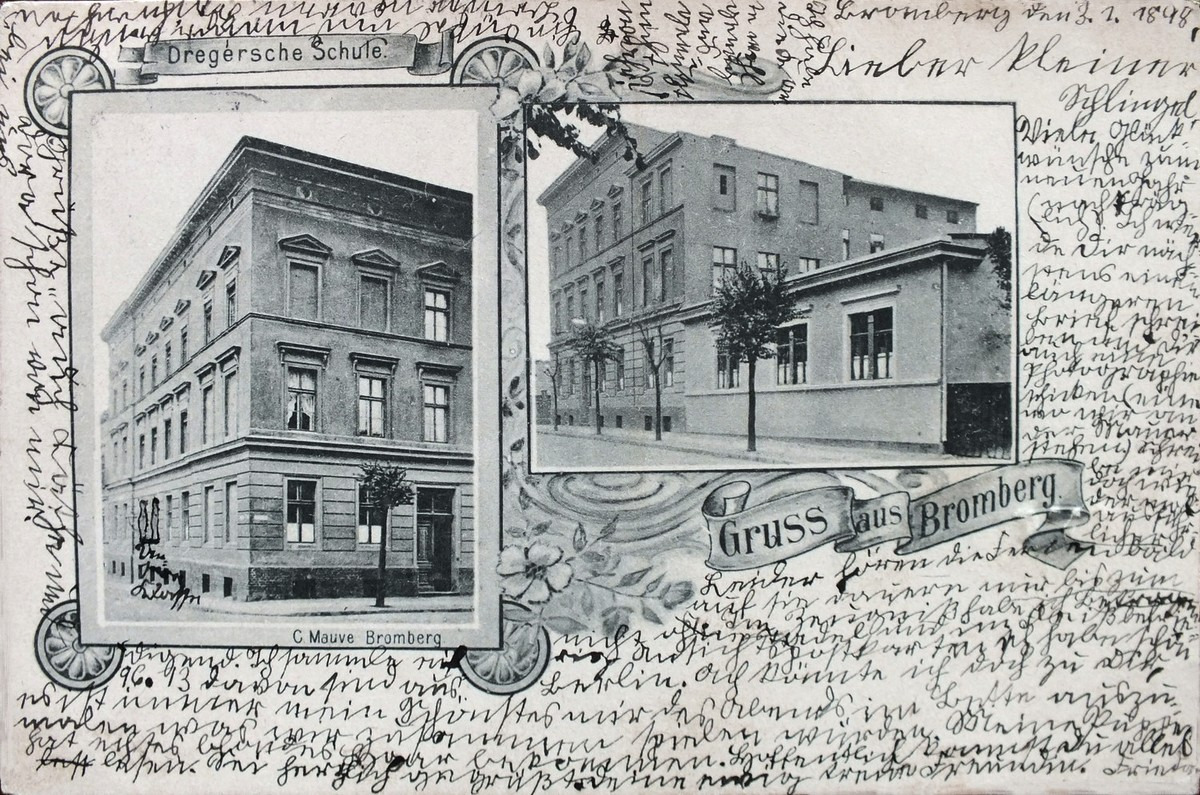
Postcard picture of the school ca 1898

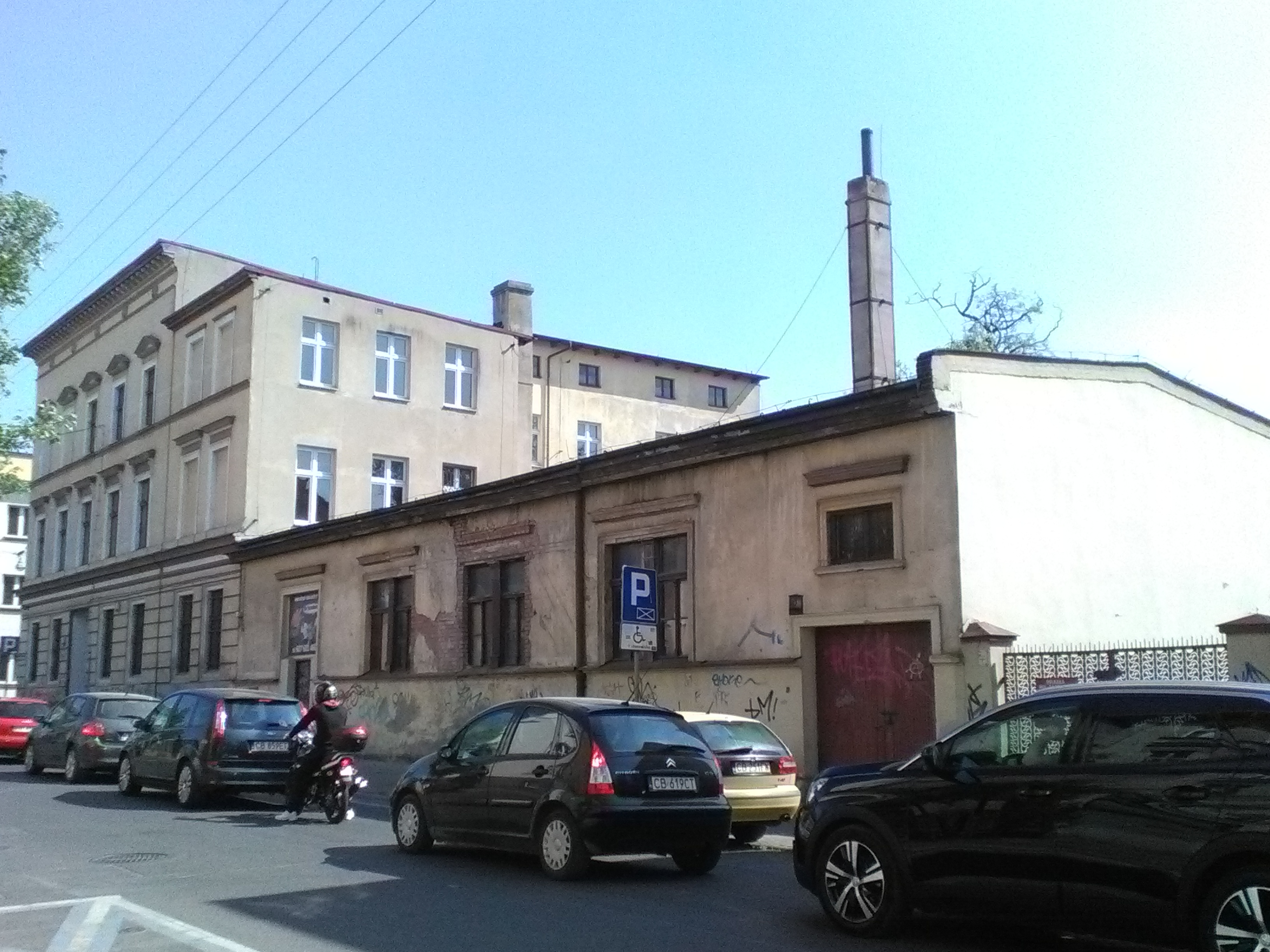
Frontages on the street, with the former gymnasium on the far right

=== Tenement at 14 ===
1883

Neoclassical architecture and Industrial architecture

The first landlord, in the early 1880s, was Elvira Conradt, living in nearby Töpferstraße (today's Zduny street).

In 1884, an industrial machine workshop had been built there by Hermann Claus, living at 19 Bahnofstraße (today's 34 Dworcowa Street). At the end of the 19th century, the place was taken over by the Böhmer Brothers to manufacture railroad cars: the successful firm Ostdeutsche Wagenfabrik Gebrüder Böhmer moved a few years later to the eastern suburb of Schröttersdorf (today's Skrzetusko district). After their departure, a printing house set up in the premises, run by Julius Arndt. The institution survived WWI and during the 1920s a drukarnia operated there.

The ensemble consists of two buildings: the ex-workshop, bearing bricks giving onto the street and a faded neo-classical features house in the backyard, with terraces and avant-corps. One can still make out the writing Drukarnia (printing house) on the wall of the brick edifice.

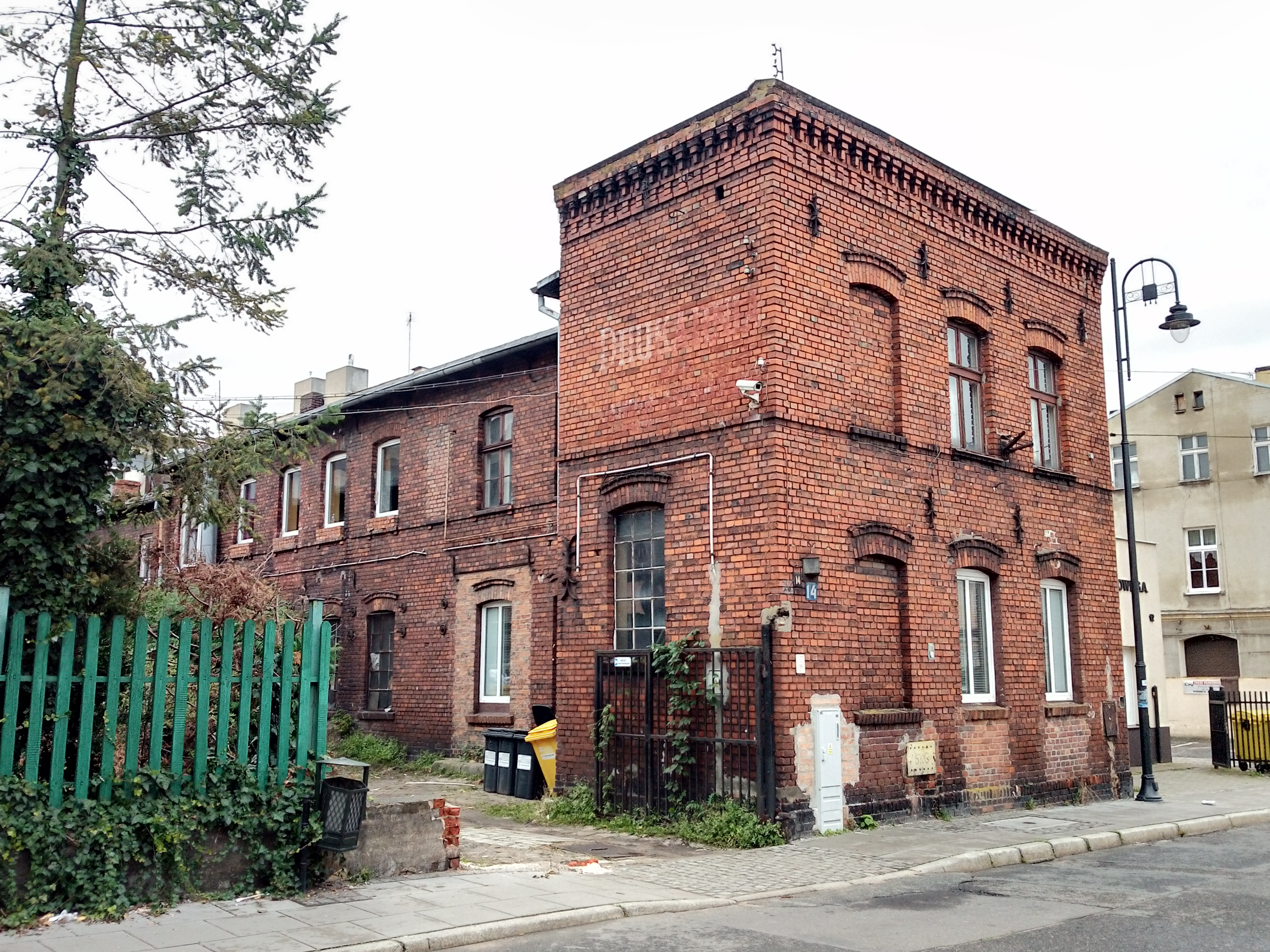
Former print house

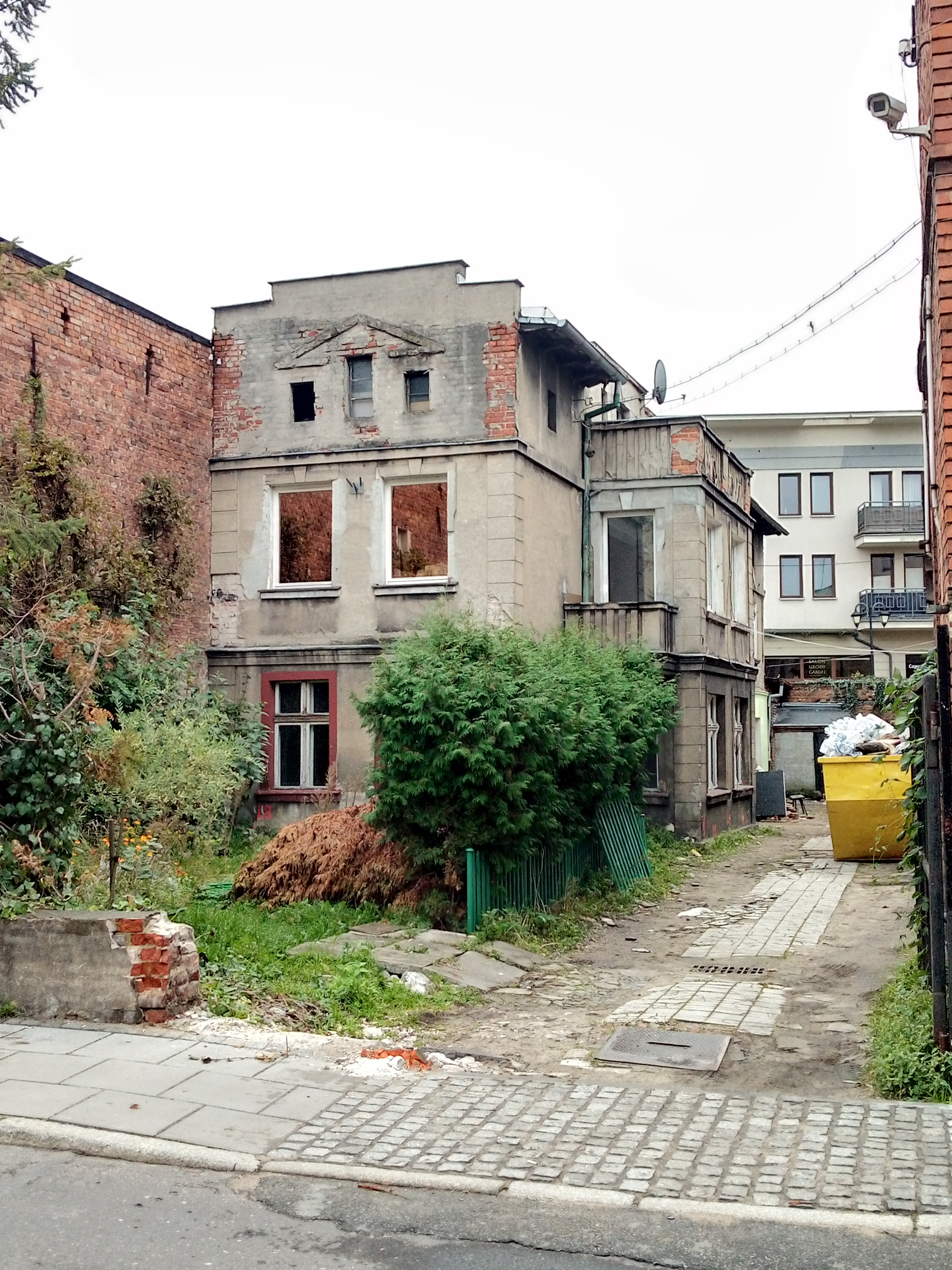
Backyard building

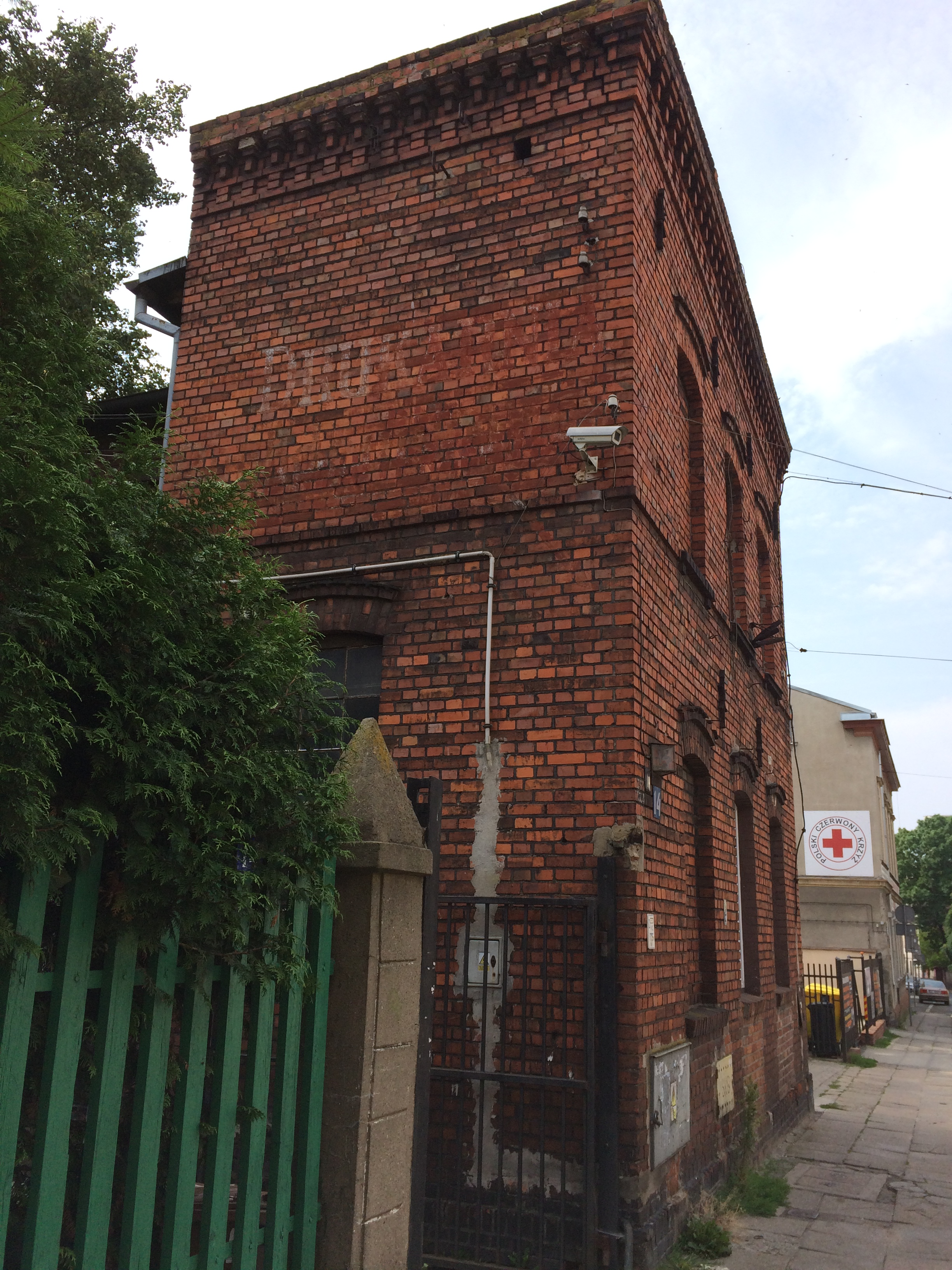
Print house with fading wall writing Drukarnia

=== Tenement at 15 ===
1925

Industrial architecture

On January 8, 1925, the newly factory Polon (Polish: Fabryk żarówek elektryczny Tow. Akc."Polon") producing light bulbs opened there. The firm went broke in the early 1930s. At the time, the address was 9 Warmińskiego street or 9 Gamma street.

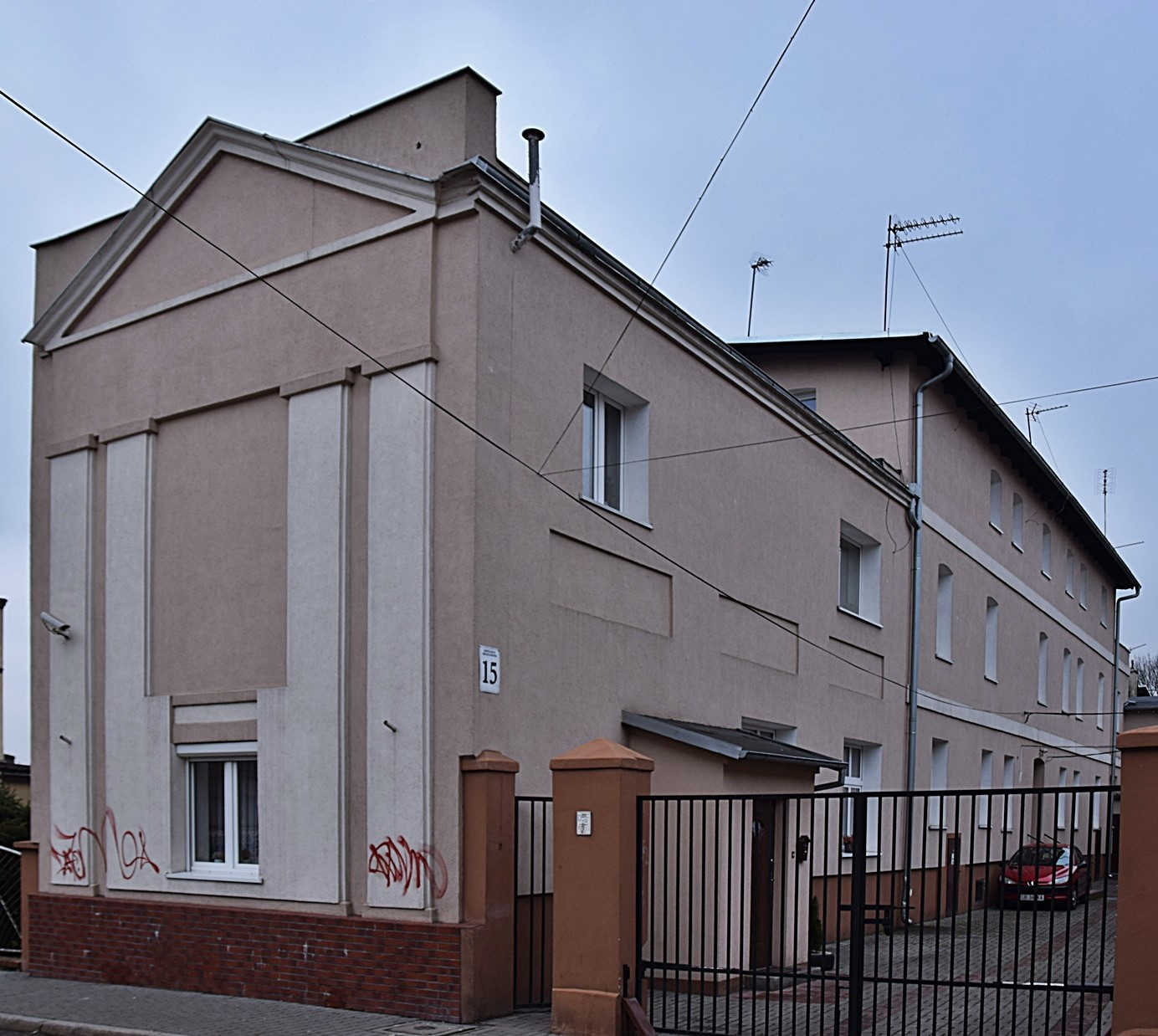
View of the former workshop from the street

=== Tenement at 18, corner with Dworcowa Street ===
1905, by Carl Rose

Art Nouveau

First mention of the building at then Bahnhoffstraße 88 occurred in 1872: Hermann Burow, a baker, was the owner. In 1890, August Hoffmann set up there a butcher shop (German: Fleischerei und Wurst-Fabrik). During the interwar period, it has been the local seat of the National Bank of Poland. It is now the seat of Bydgoszcz Tax Office .

The building recently renovated displays Art Nouveau architecture in Bydgoszcz: round shapes (dormers, gate, windows), vegetal motifs on the elevation, the bay windows and asymmetry of both facades.

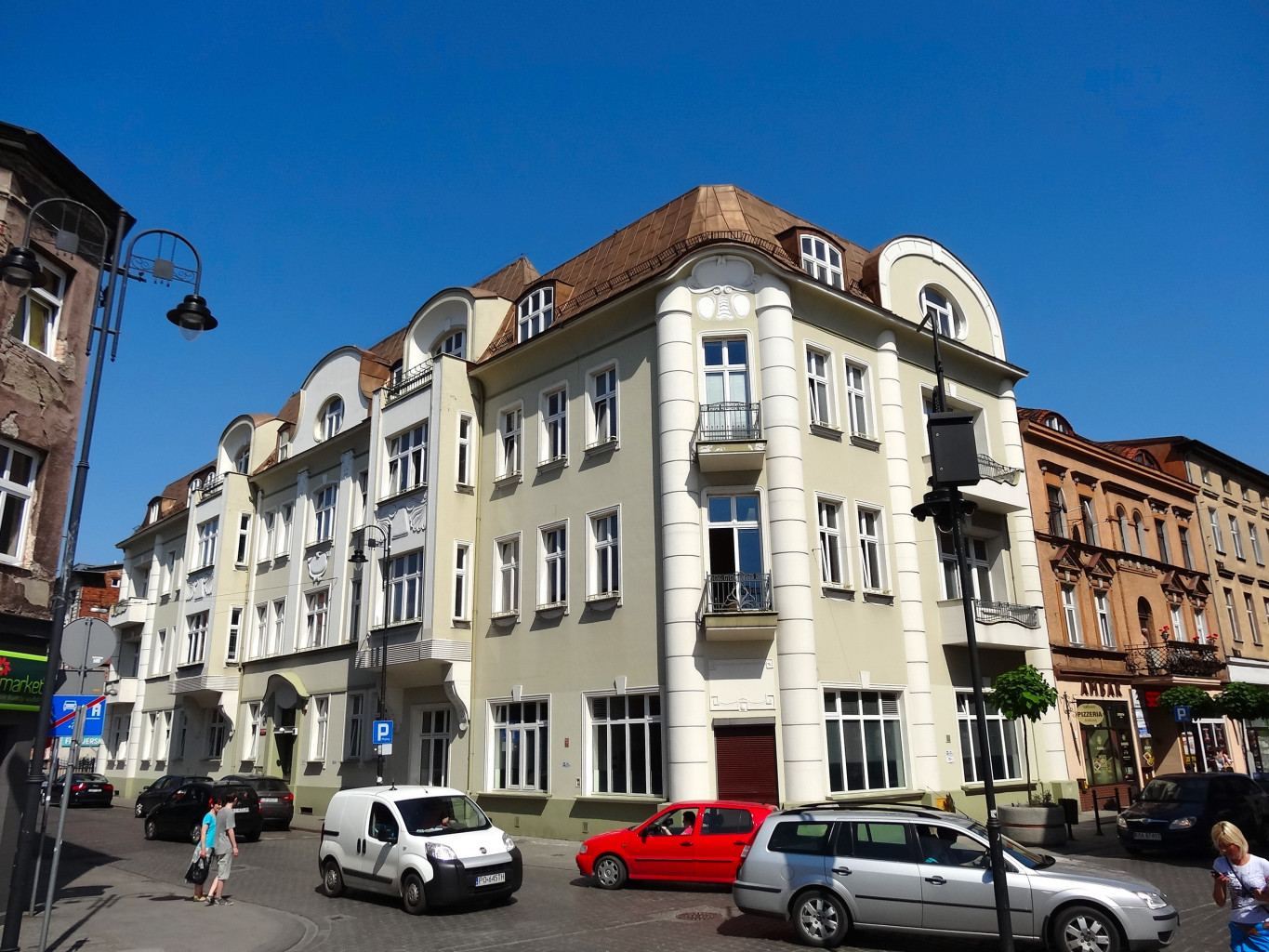
Facades view from street crossing

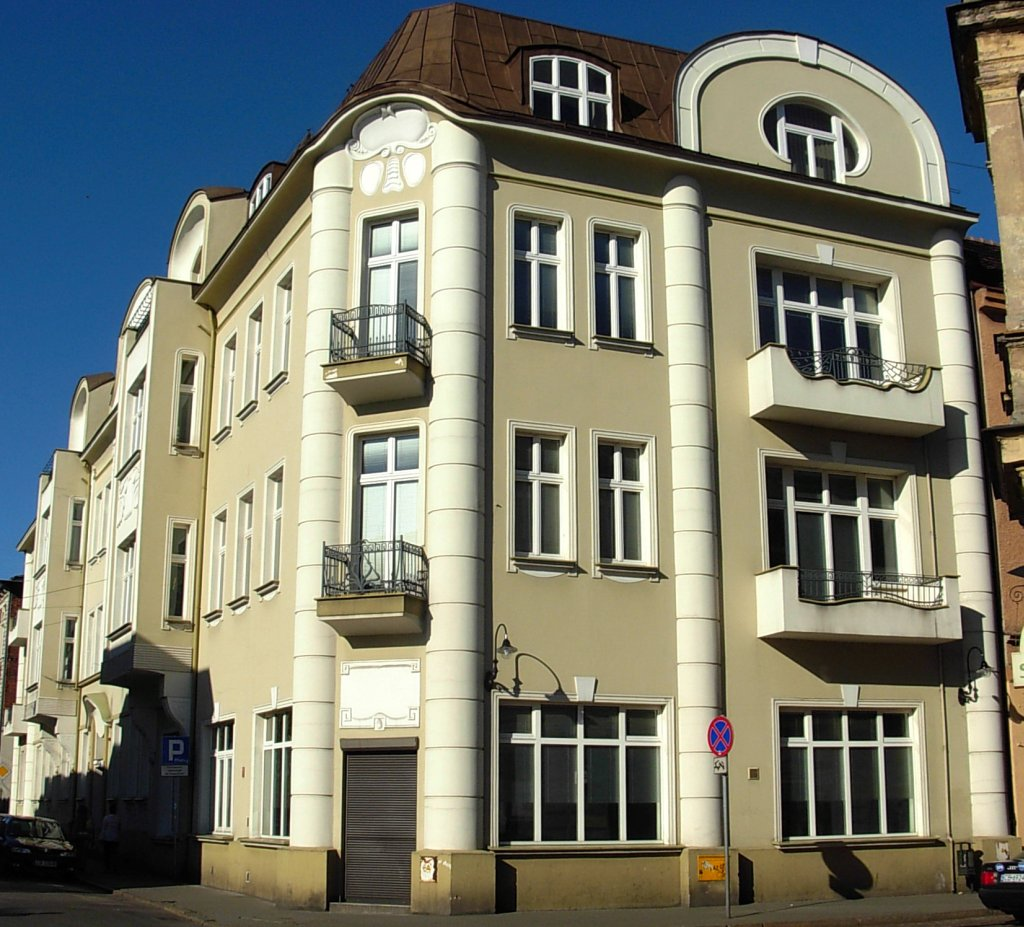
Facade on Dworcowa Street

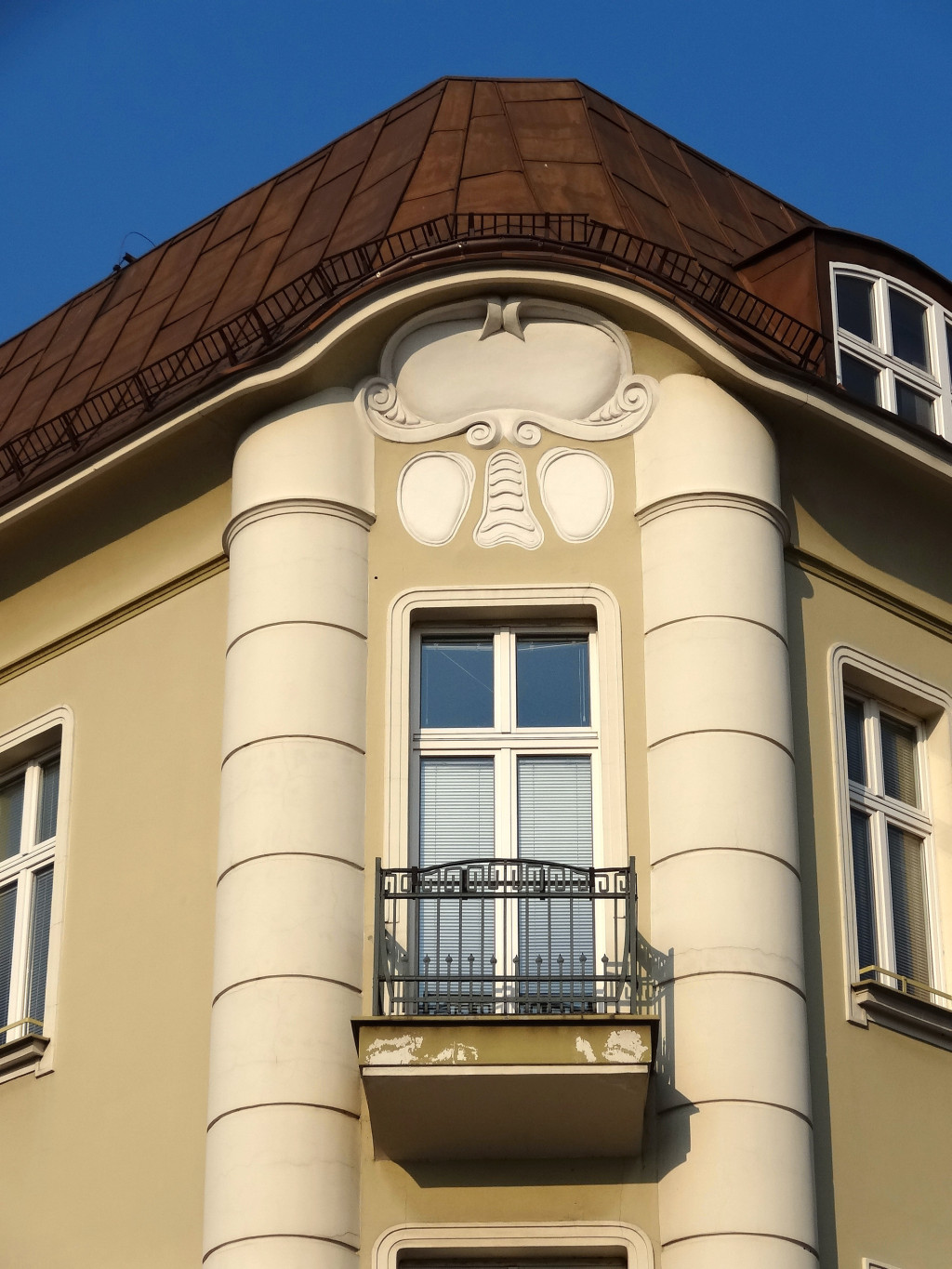
Detail of corner facade

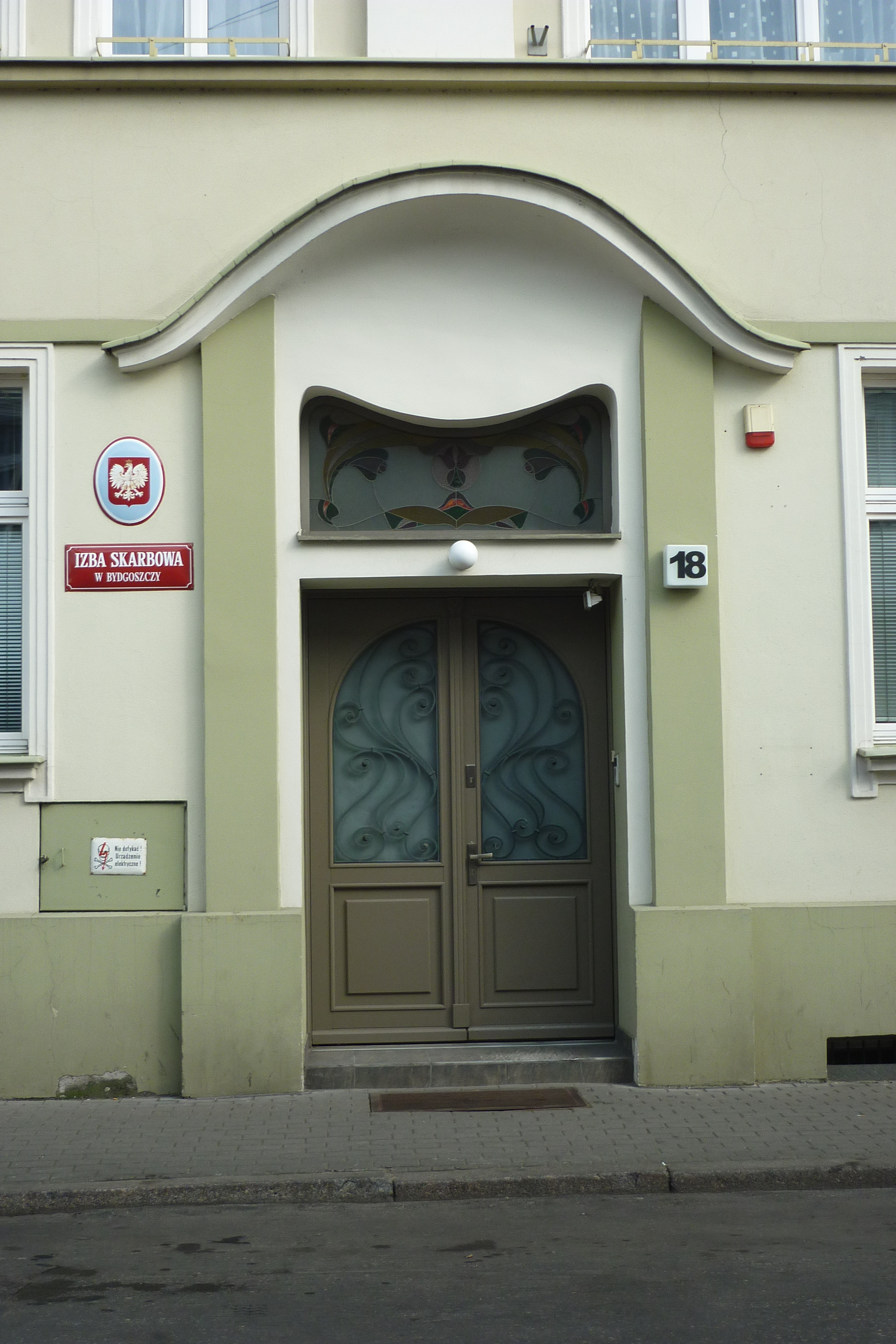
Detail of the gate

=== Tenement at 19 Dworcowa Street, corner with Warmińskiego street ===
Registered on Kuyavian-Pomeranian Voivodeship heritage list, Nr.601287-Reg.A/968, November 12, 1992

1880, by Albert Rose

Eclecticism

Friedrish Giese, a brewer at Bahnhoffstraße 7a was the first owner of the house. Otto Pfefferkorn, a successful entrepreneur in the furniture business, acquired it in 1887, before having his own house built at Nr.12. In 1910, the building became an hotel, Reichshof, run by Carl Müller. In 1922, it changed to Goplana, run by Jan Gawron, then Boston. From 1932 to 1939, it has been renamed Gastronomia, led by H. Katorski; after WWII, the business was re-branded Hotel Sródmiejski. It is now a habitation building, where the Honorary Consul of the Federal Republic of Germany in Bydgoszcz moved in 2019 -previously it was located at 49 Śniadeckich street.

The building renovated in 2019 a nice decoration on the first floor, with pediments topping windows and ornamented cartouche beneath, as well as a row of round openings below the roof. The main feature is the grand two-floor stretched bay window standing on streets corner.

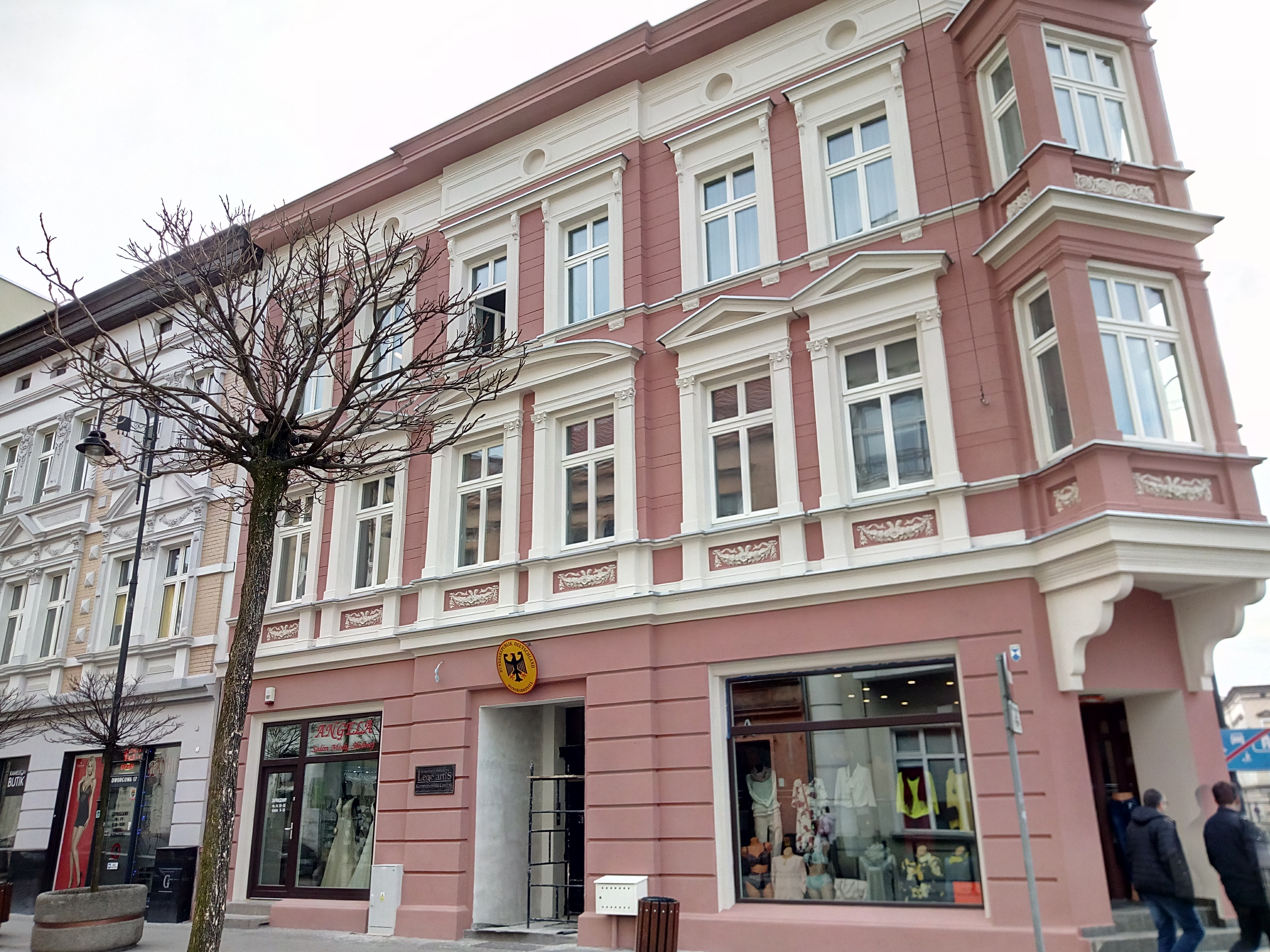
Elevation on Dworcowa street

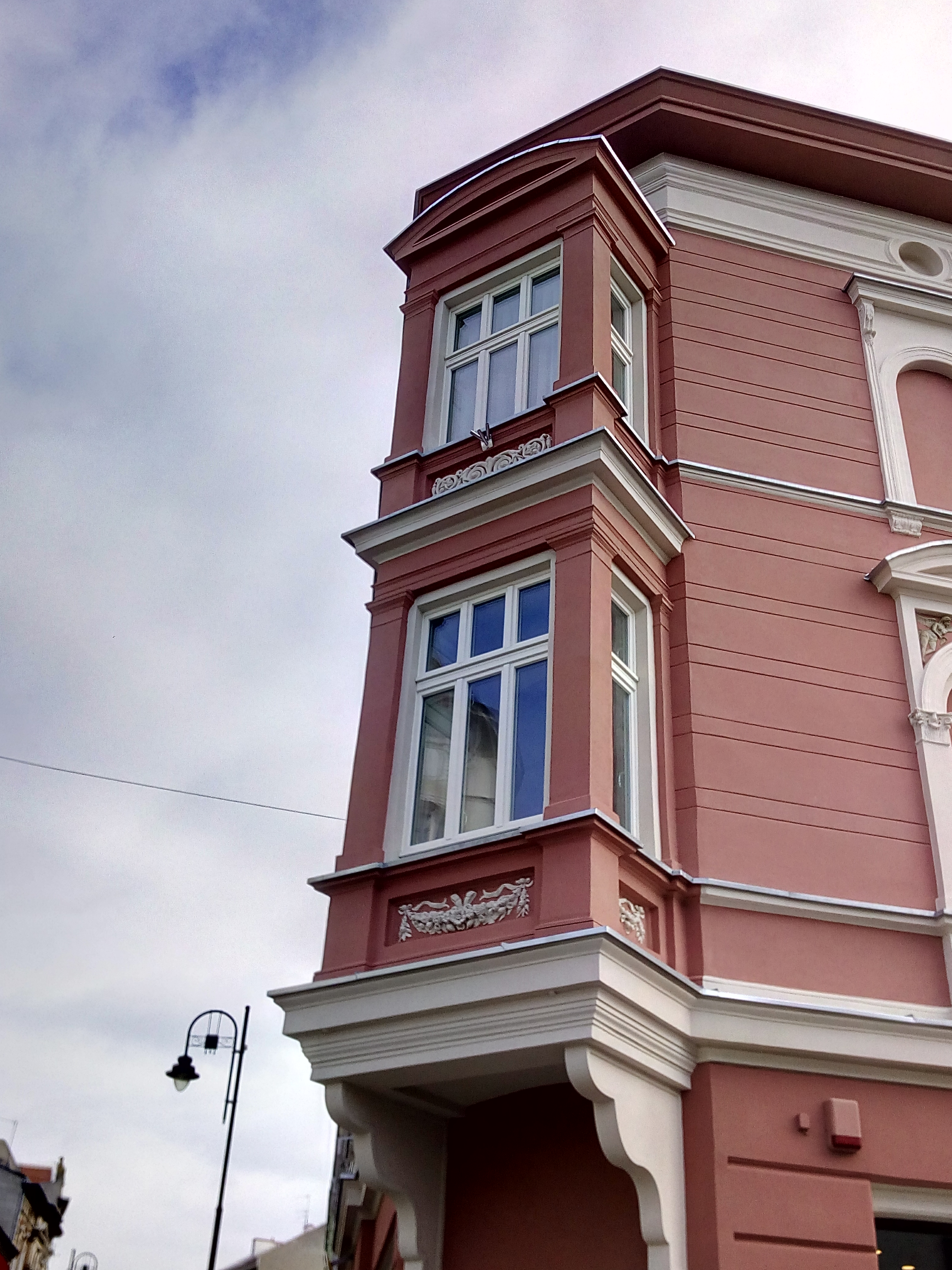
Bay window

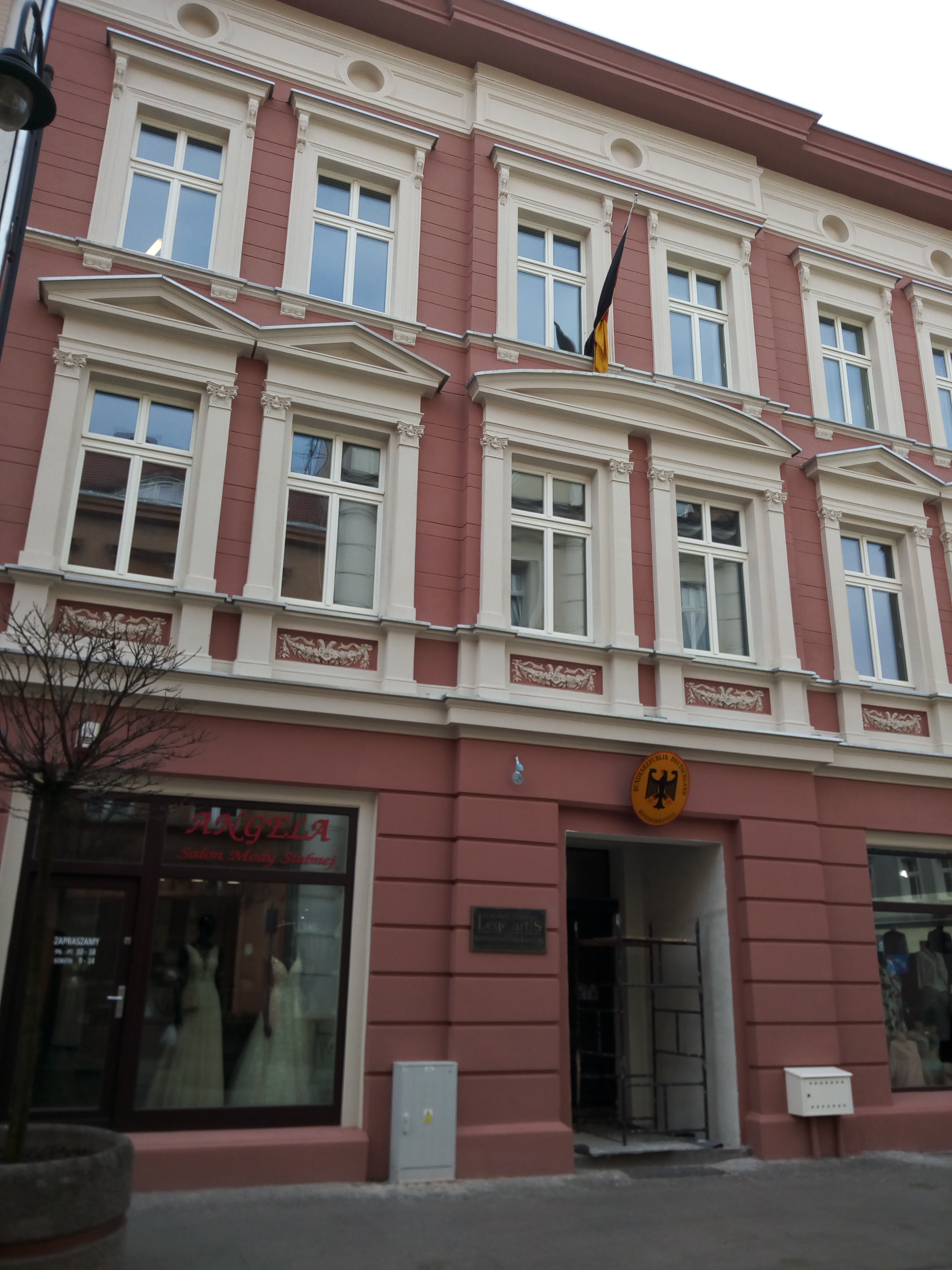
Honorary German Consulate

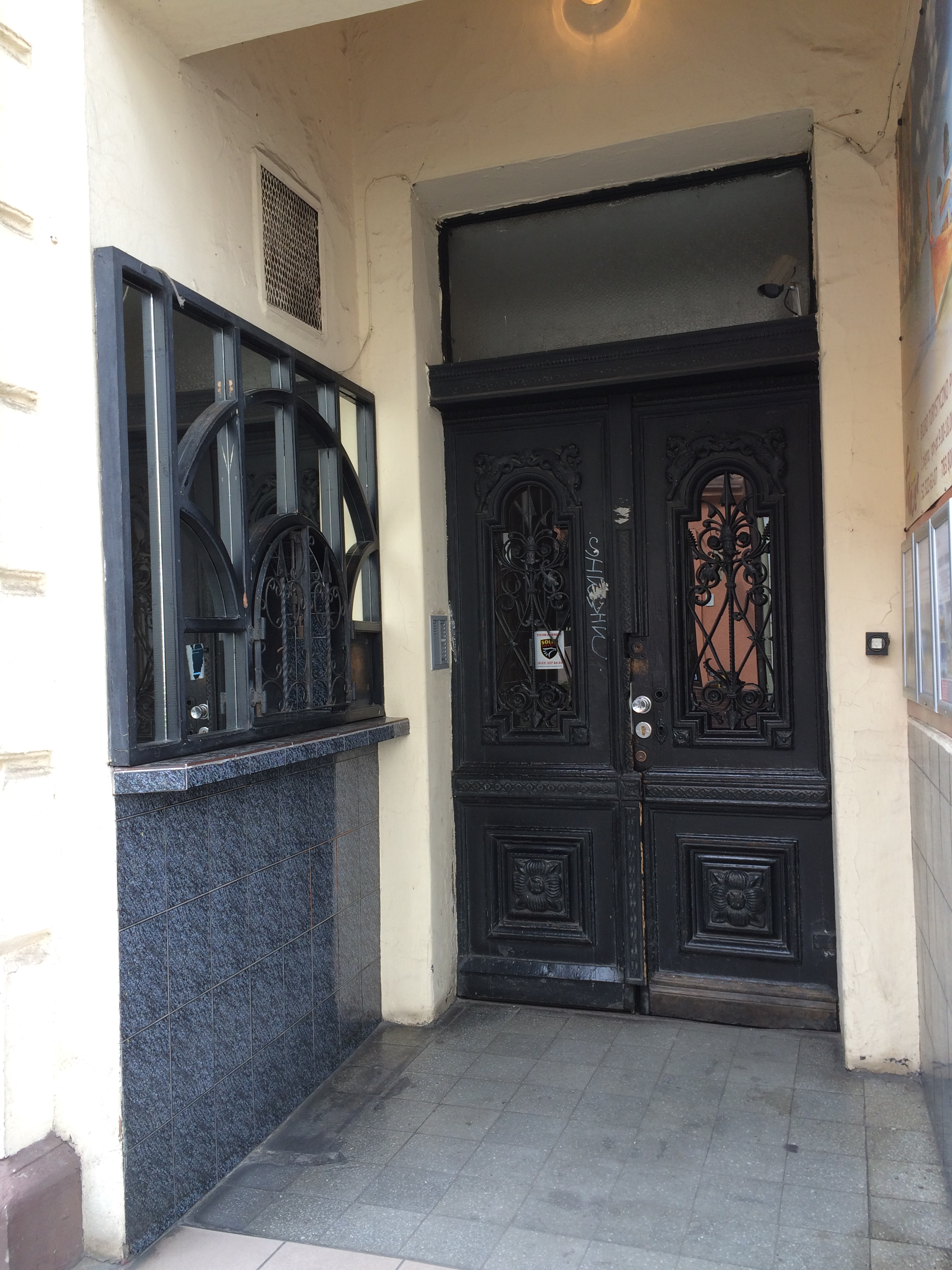
Gate and door recess

=== Tenement at 20 ===
1891–1892

Eclecticism

The first building owner was Hermann Albrecht, a tradesman in wood and coal.

The renovated facade recalls similar buildings in downtown, like Carl Stampehl's 3 Dworcowa Street or Carl Meyer tenement.

One can underline the following elements: bossage, shell-shape pediments, window brackets and a monumental portal encasing a wooden door with a stained glass transom.

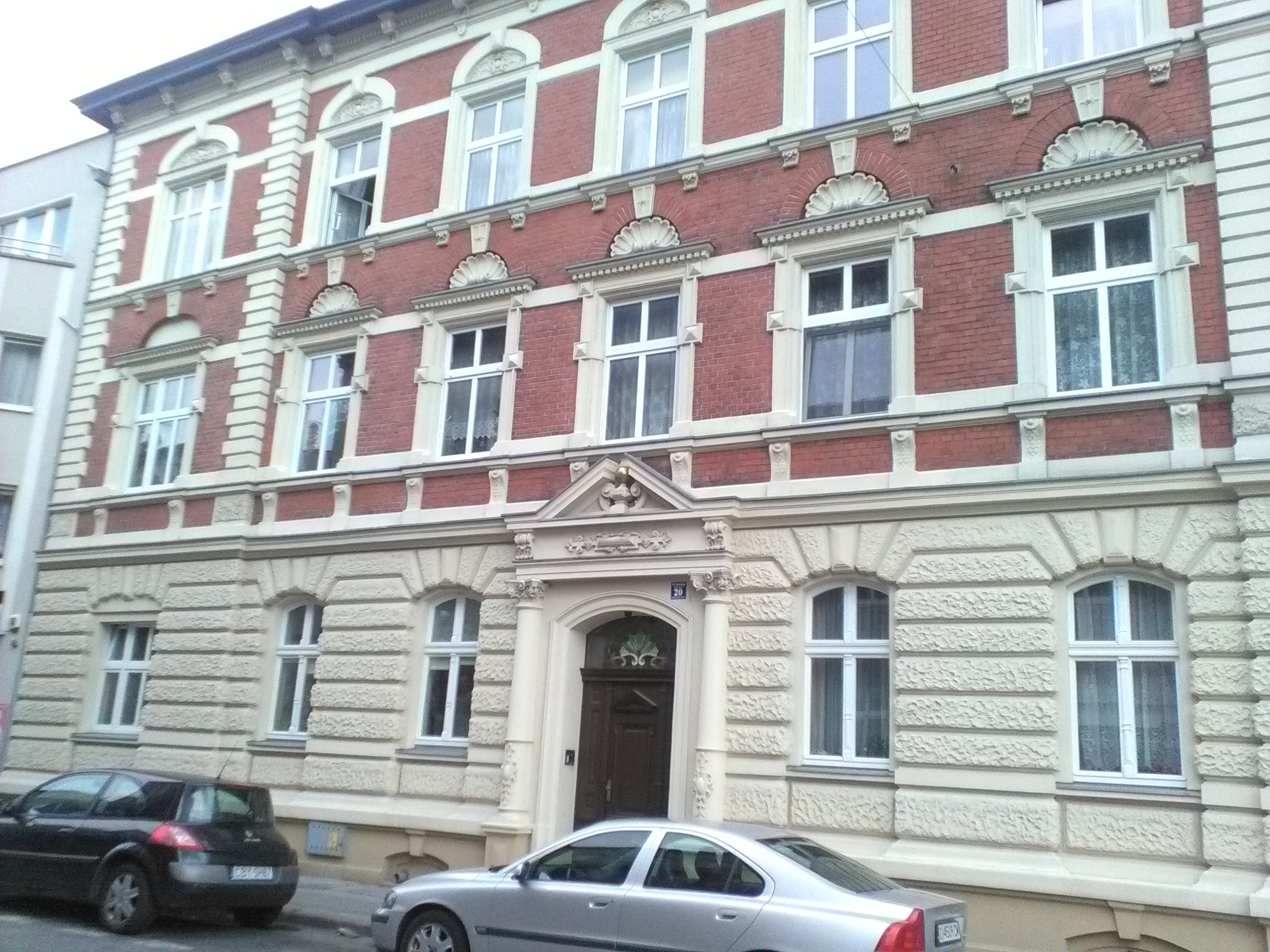
Facade on the street

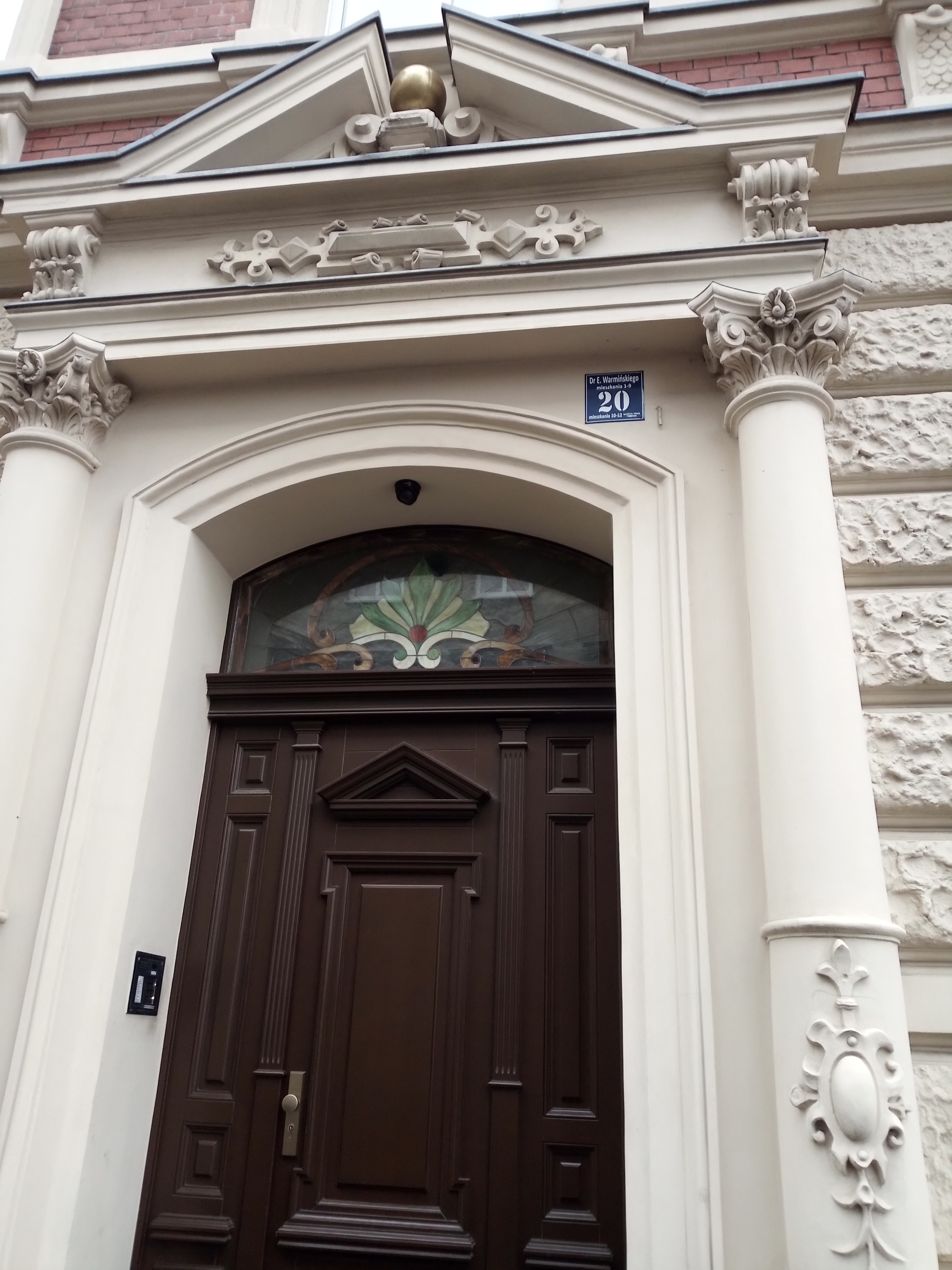
Door and portal

=== Hermann Albrecht tenement at 22, corner with Podolska street ===
1887

Eclecticism

Hermann Albrecht, also owner of the adjoining house at Nr.20, commissioned the current tenement where he lived from 1888 onwards.

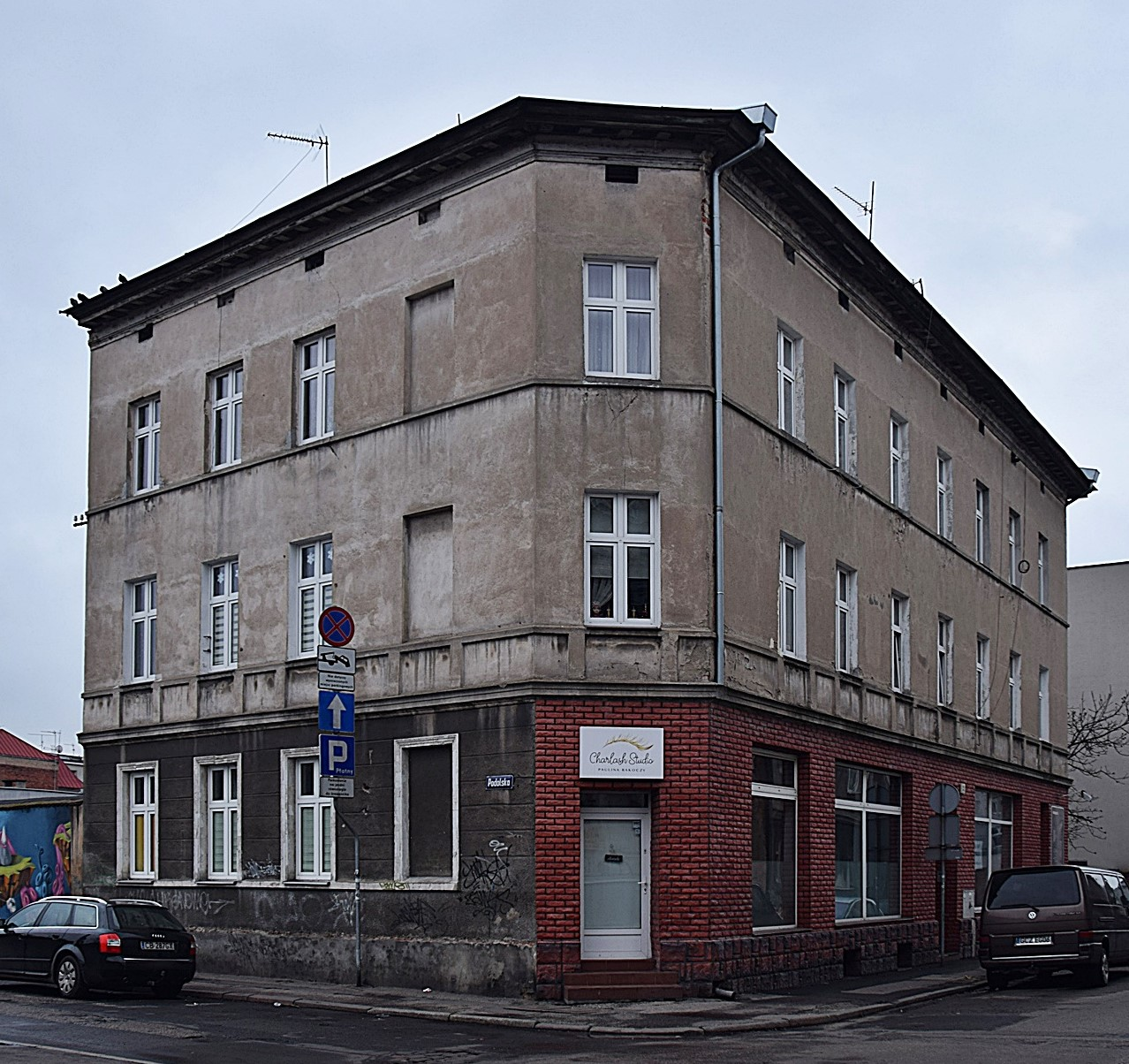
View from the street

=== Tenement at Nr.23 ===
1866

Eclecticism

August Kalinowski, an inspector in hospitals, is referenced as the initial landlord of the tenement.

Although degraded, the building -one of the oldest in the street- displays, in particular, a pilastered portal framing the door gate upon which one can still discern vegetal motifs carved out.

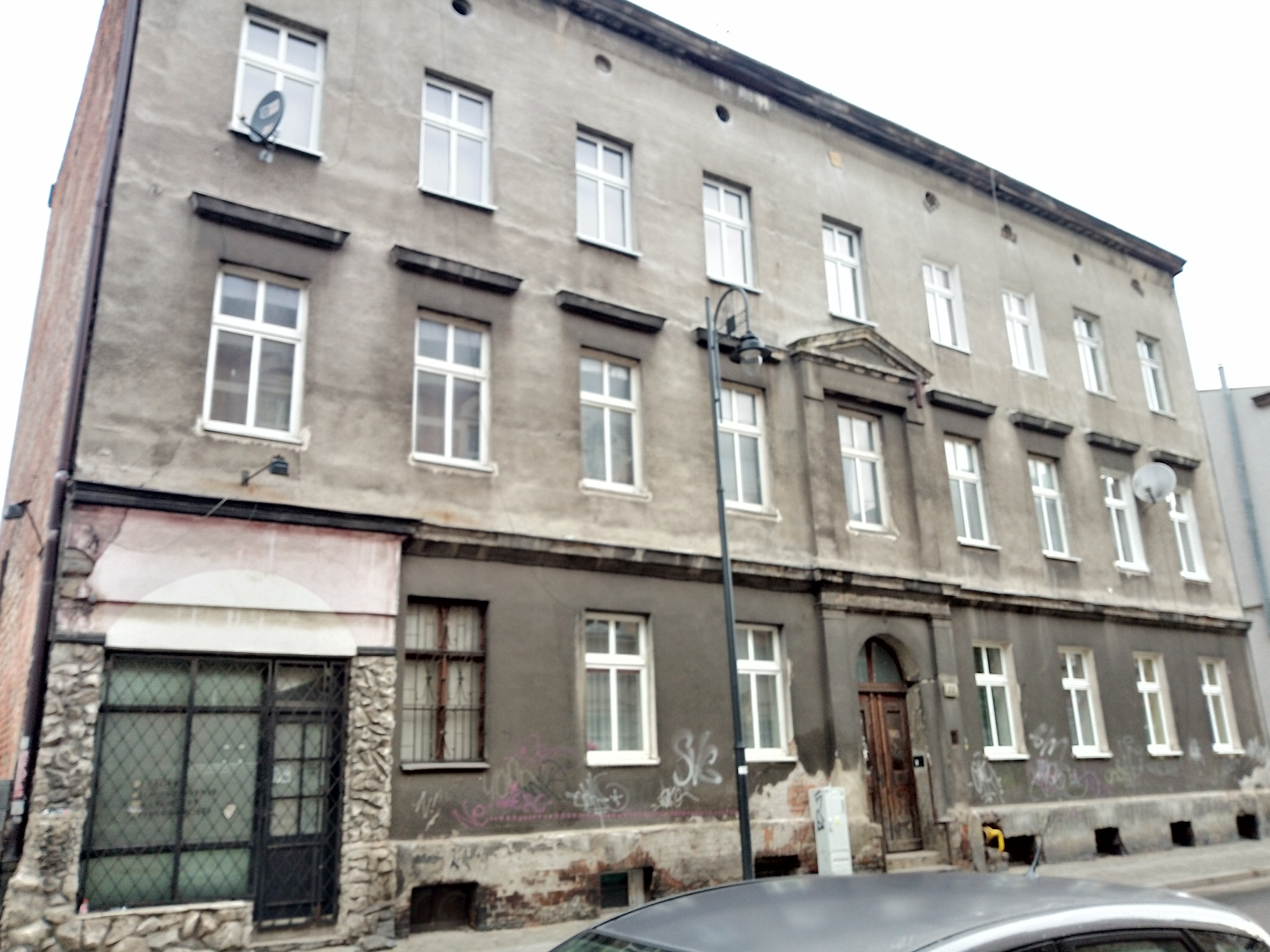
Main frontage

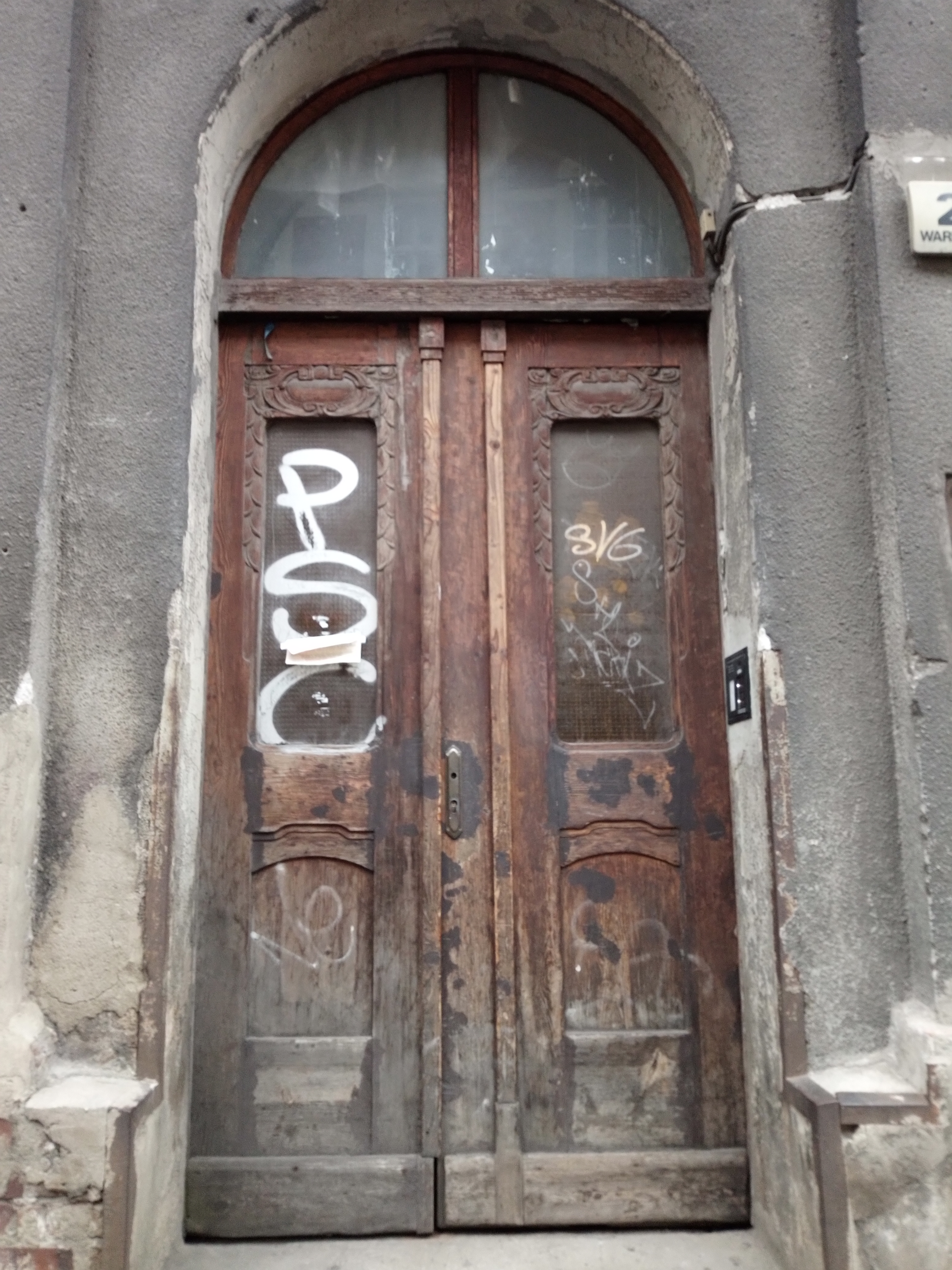
Door and portal

=== Tenement at 27, corner with Podolska street ===
1850–1875

Eclecticism

Initially at 17 Töpfler straße, it was the property of August Kasprowicz, a rentier. In 1885, it was purchased by Karl Beeß, in chimney sweep business. His family kept ownership of the tenement until the beginning of the 1930s.

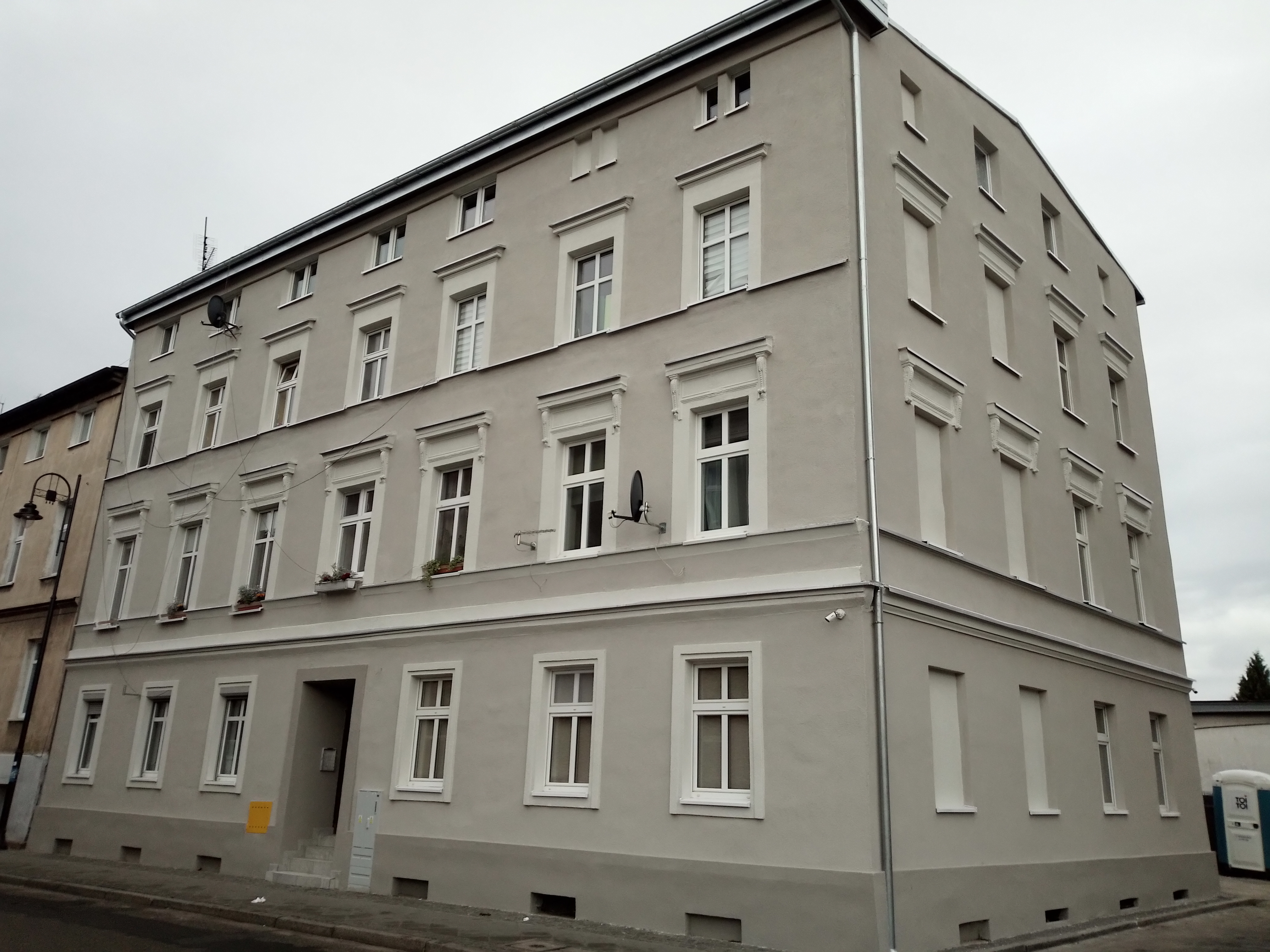
View from the street

=== Tenement at 29, corner with 9 Zduny street ===
1850–1875

Eclecticism

The commissioner of this extensive tenement was Dr. Hugo Bille, an ophthalmologist living at 1a Hoffmann straße, today's 3 Piotra Skargi Street. Dr Bille ran a medical cabinet at Hoffmann straße, but was also a practitioner at the Luisen Stift (in present time Swederowo district) and at the Deaconess hospital (in today's Bielawy district).

This vast building occupies a block between Zduny, Podolska and Warmińskiego streets. In need of a renovation, is still boasts remarkable details, such as:

- round top windows with stained glass;
- an avant-corps topped by a terrace, both on Podolska elevation;
- a round shape corner frontage on Zduny/Warmińskiego;
- a deteriorated door entrance on Zduny, which still displays delicate carving motifs.
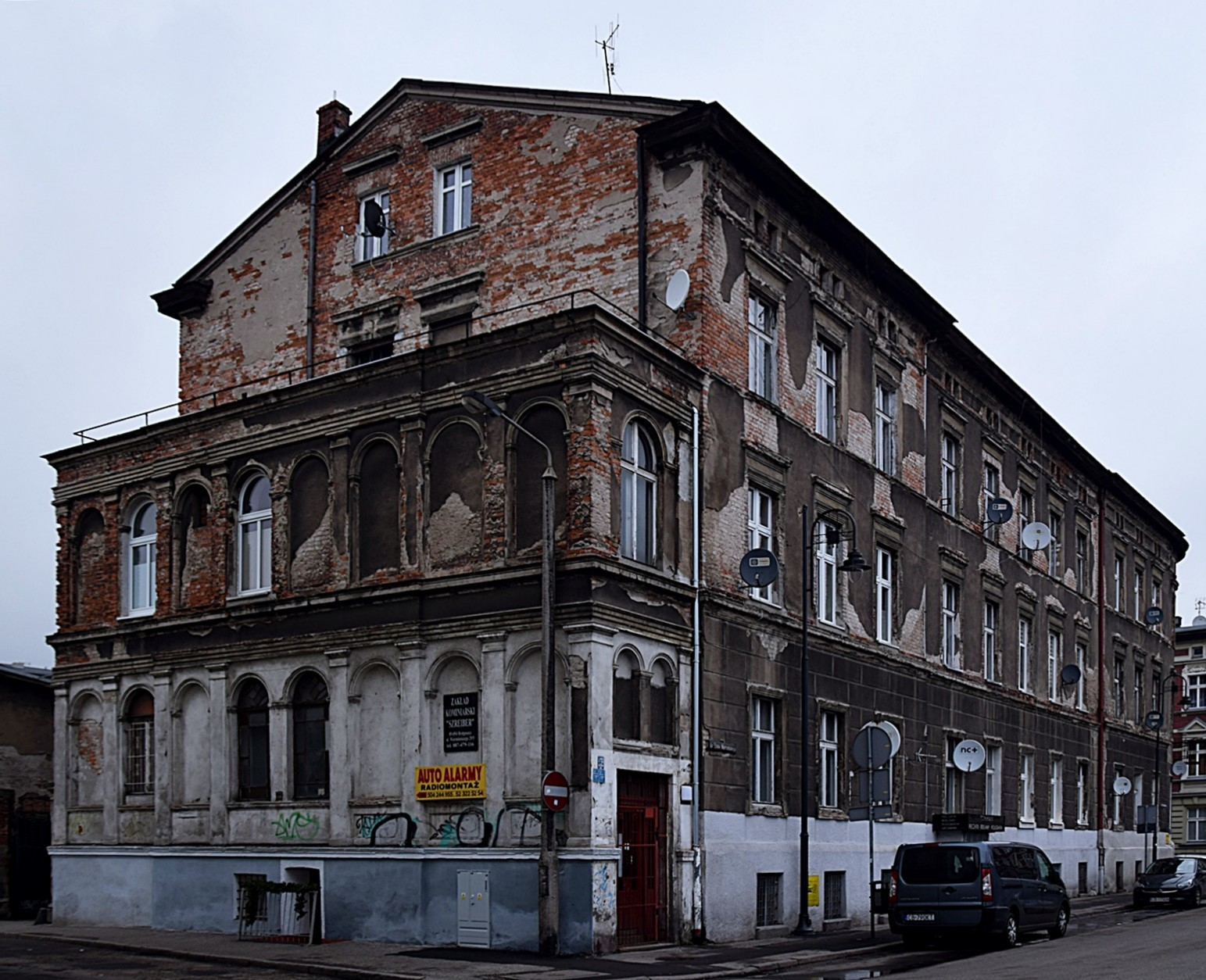
View from Warmińskiego street

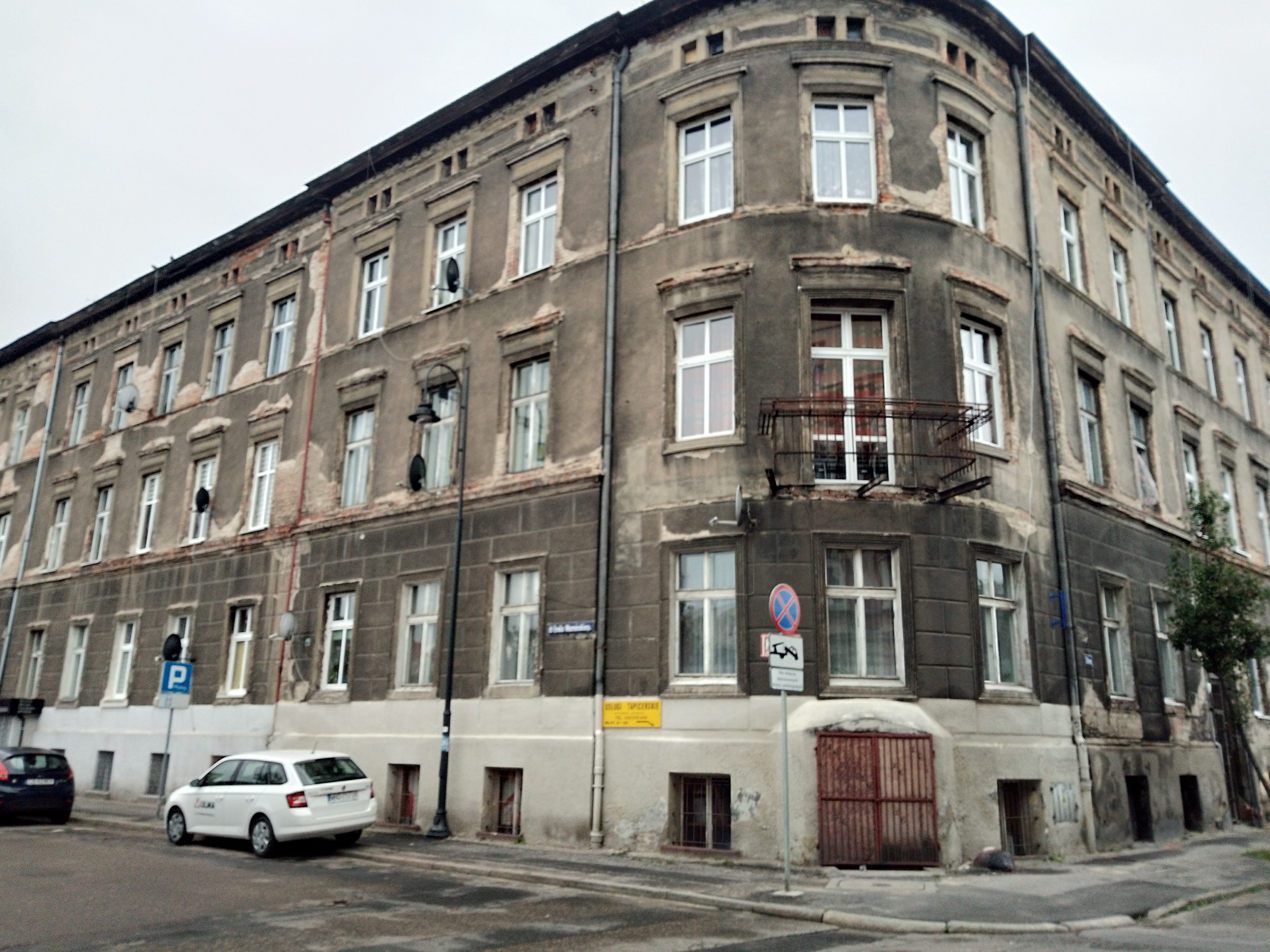
View from Zduny street

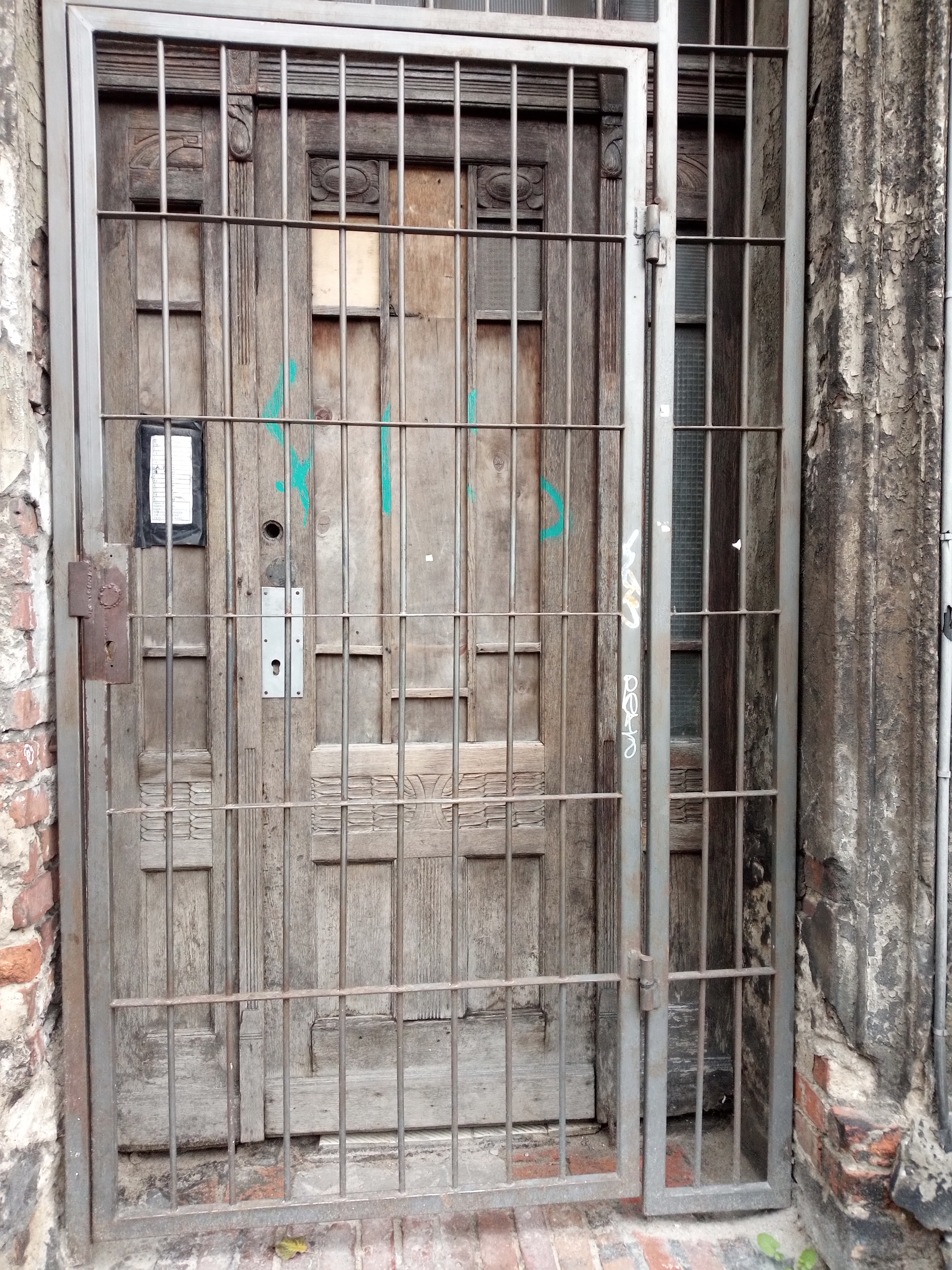
Door on Zduny street

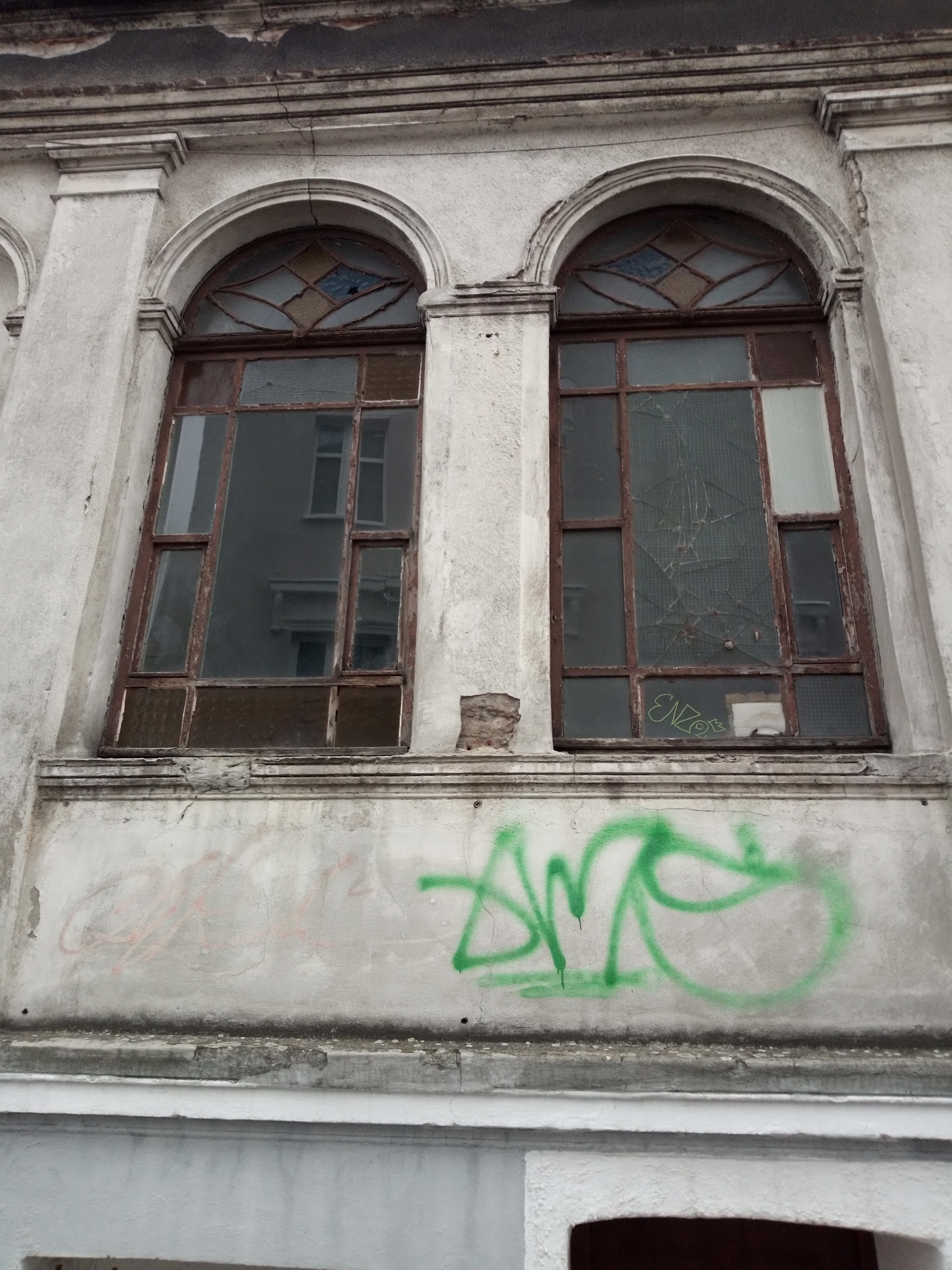
Stained glass windows

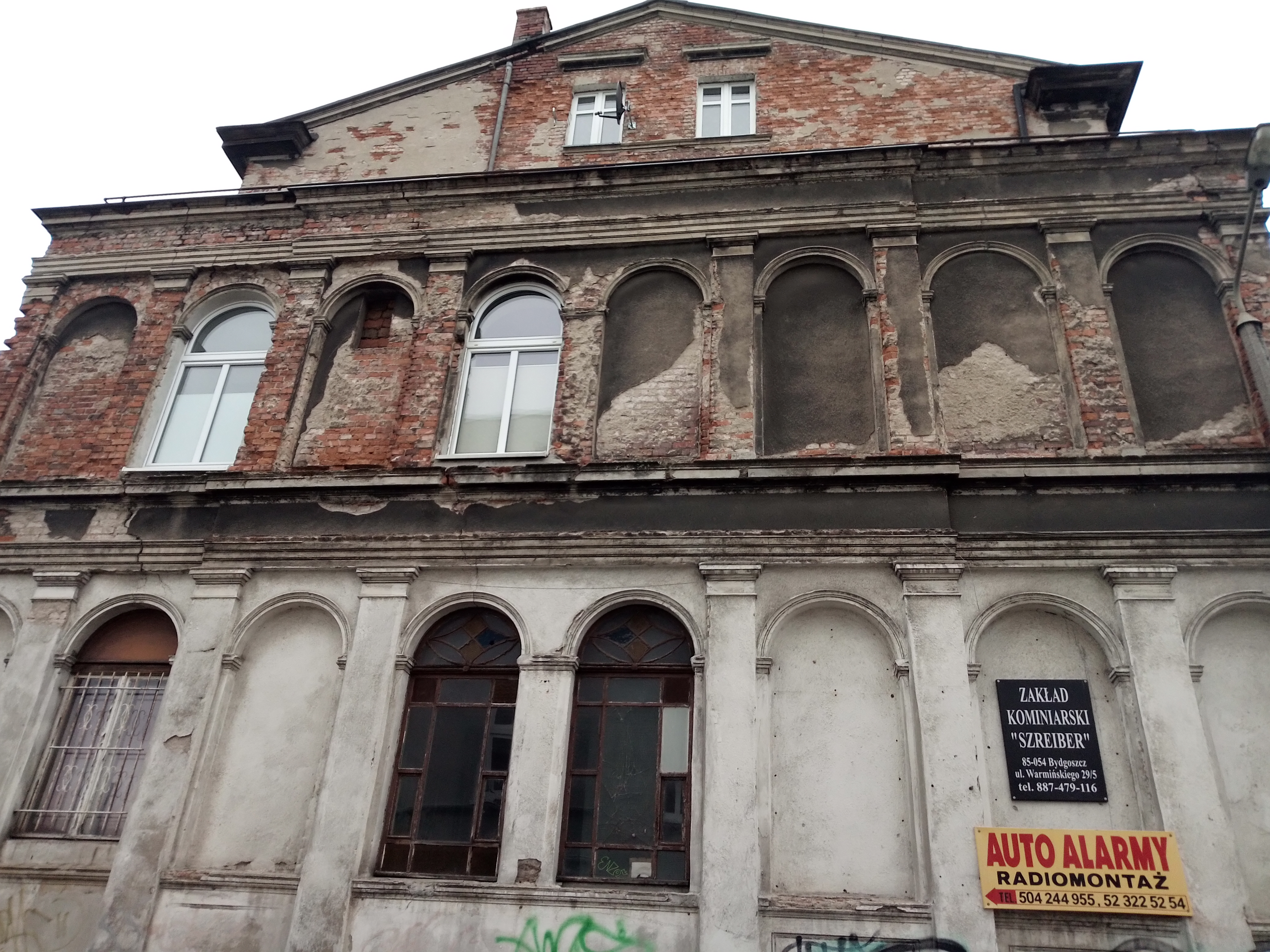
Elevation on Podolska street

== See also ==
- Bydgoszcz
- Opera Nova
- Emil Warmiński
