= Marcinkowskiego Street, Bydgoszcz =

Street in Bydgoszcz, Poland

Coordinates: 53°07′39.4″N 17°59′52″E

Marcinkowskiego street
Bydgoszcz
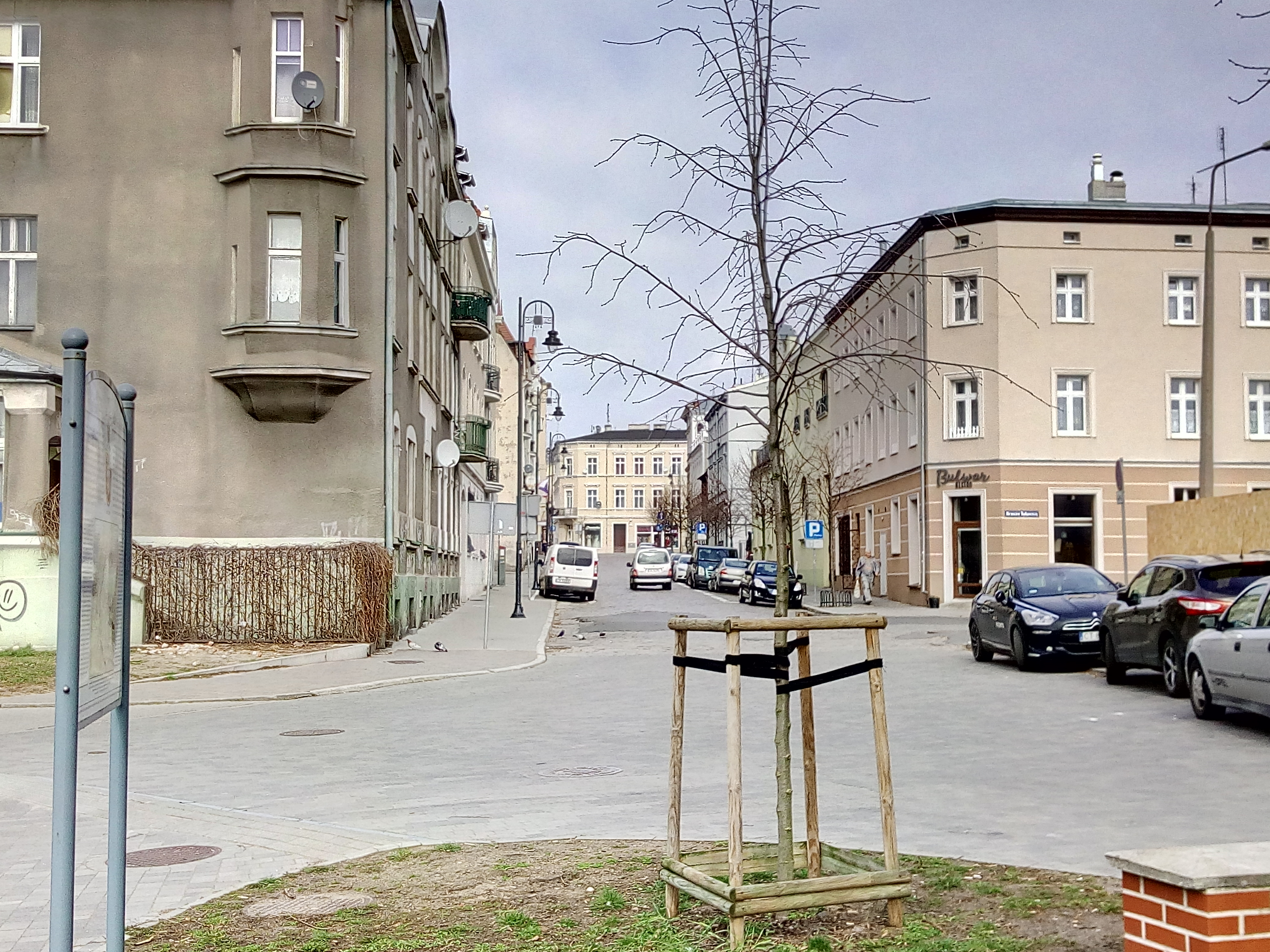
- Street view northward

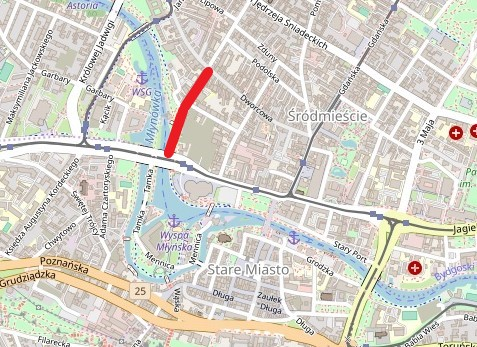
- Marcinkowskiego Street highlighted on Bydgoszcz map
- Native name: Ulica Karola Marcinkowskiego (Polish)
- Former name: Fischer straße
- Namesake: Karol Marcinkowski
- Owner: City of Bydgoszcz
- Length: 300 m (980 ft)
- Width: ca. 10 m
- Area: Downtown district
- Location: Bydgoszcz, Poland

Construction
- Construction start: Early 1850s
- Completed: Early 1900s

Marcinkowskiego street is located in the downtown district of Bydgoszcz. It has been laid in the 1850s. Most of the frontages on this street offer 19th century architectural interests, starting from the house along the city lock on the Brda river to a tenement by Józef Święcicki on the crossing with Dworcowa Street.

== Location ==
Marcinkowskiego street runs on a rough south–north axis. Its southern end borders the Brda river's edge; further north, it crosses Obrońców Bydgoszczy and stops while intercepting Dworcowa street.

== History ==
Marcinkowskiego street was registered in an early 1850s map of Bromberg, under the name of Fischer straße. A couple of buildings in the street dates back to this time.

In 1884, the city built an original trapezoid-shaped lock on the Brda river, near the 1774 wooden city lock. The pathway, initially known as Fischer straße, changed to Marcinkowskiego when Poland re-recovered its existence.

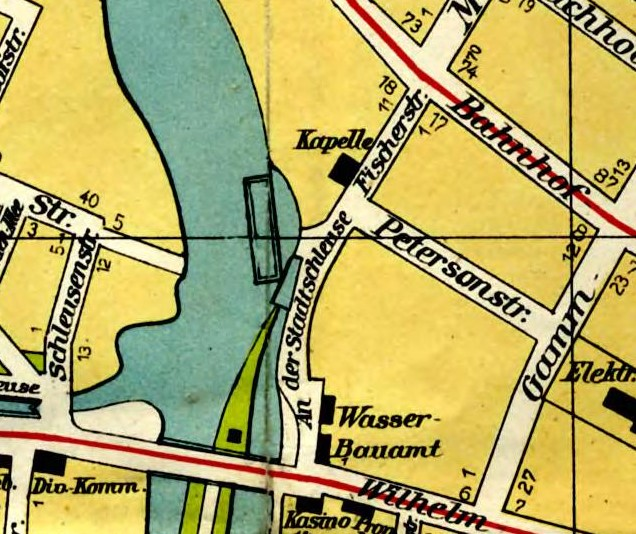
1914 Map view of street

Years of occupation of Bydgoszcz during the Second World War the street's name back to Fischer straße, but in 1945 the street re-took its current name, Marcinkowskiego'. The latter refers to Karol Marcinkowski (1800-1846), a Polish physician, social activist in the Grand Duchy of Posen, supporter of basic education (Praca organiczna) programmes, organizer of the Towarzystwo Naukowej Pomocy dla Młodzieży Wielkiego Księstwa Poznańskiego (transl. Scientific Association for Youth in the Grand Duchy of Poznań) and the Bazar Poznański (transl. the Poznań mall).

Until 1945, the street was divided into two segments:

- to the north, the original Fischerstraße;
- to the south, the path running along the river, called An der stadtschleuse in German (At the city lock) or Nad Portem in Polish (along the port).

Both bits have been united under the same calling Marcinkowskiego after the end of Second World War.

In 2014, the city authorities have completed a renovation of the street sidewalks and equipments.

== Main areas and edifices ==
=== Brda river edges and locks ===
The Brda river flows at the southern end of the street, where are located one active water lock and the remnant of a second one.

The original wooden lock, known as Śluza Miejska (transl. City lock), was built when the Bydgoszcz Canal was put into service in 1774, but was regularly rebuilt:

- in 1788, when the lock collapsed;
- in 1790, a construction using brick and stone started, but eventually in 1792, a wooden lock was set up again (it collapsed anew in 1803);
- another rebuilding happened in 1794;
- in the following years, the lock was modernized and repaired many times.

In 1884, a brick lock with an unusual trapezoidal shape was put into force, in order to lessen the stress on the Śluza Miejska.

In 2014, on the occasion of the 240th anniversary of the Bydgoszcz Canal, as part of the restoration of Brda river's edge, the walls and the chamber of this former trapezoidal lock were exposed for educational and historical purposes, the basin being filled with sand. Nearby, a playground for children and a fountain network have been opened.

In 2005, the city lock ensemble (lock, engine room, control room and lock house) was entered on the Kuyavian-Pomeranian Voivodeship Heritage List (Nr.601229 Reg.A/209), 31 March 1931.

In October 2014, a major year-long overhaul of the lock has been performed including the maintenance of walls and bottom of the lock chamber, mechanical elements, slopes, retaining walls, circulation channels, installation of sound and vision monitoring, renovation of access roads and fences. Eventually, the lock re-entered operational service on April 30, 2016.

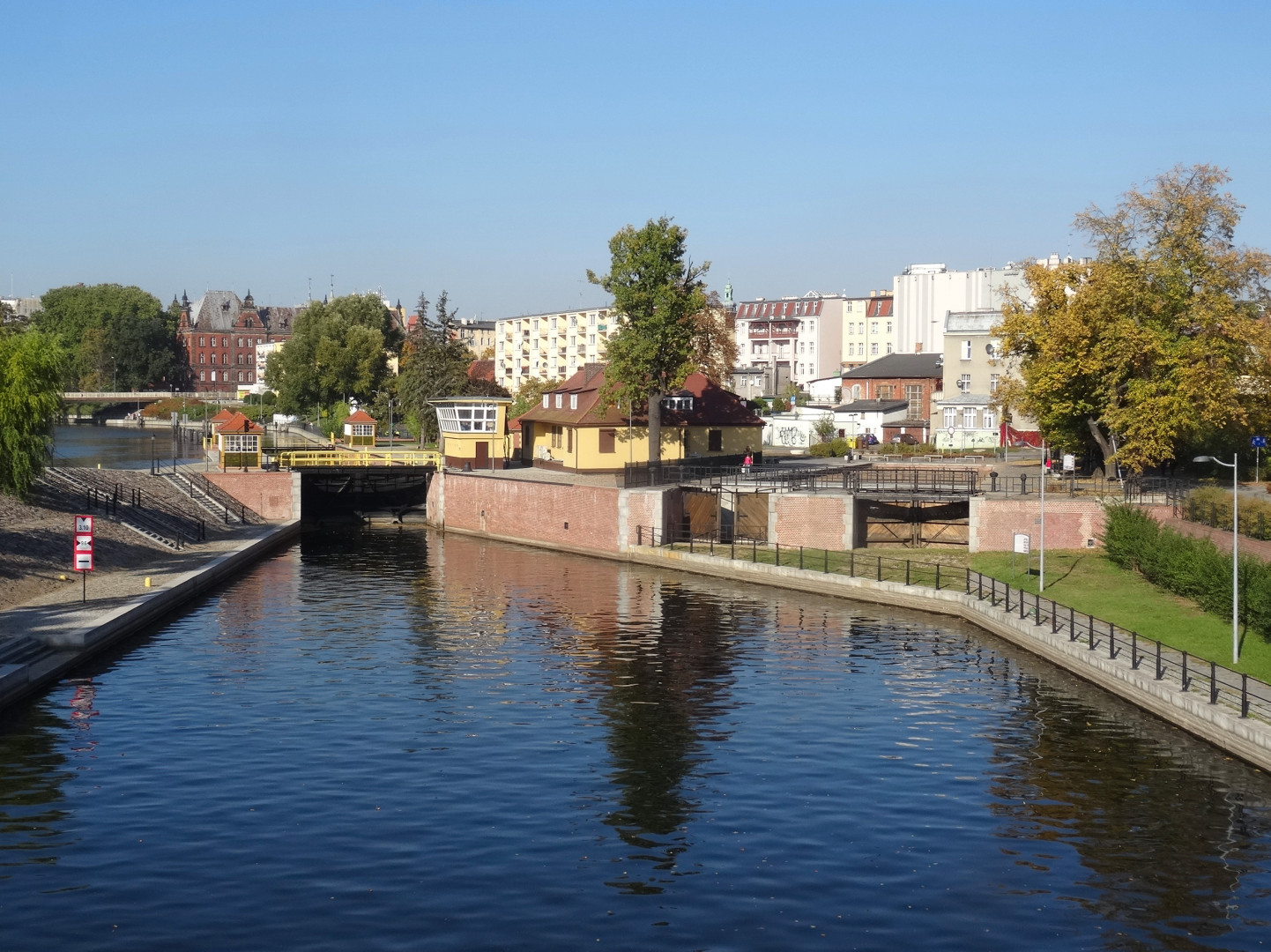
View of the city lock (in water on the left) and the trapezoidal lock (on the right side)

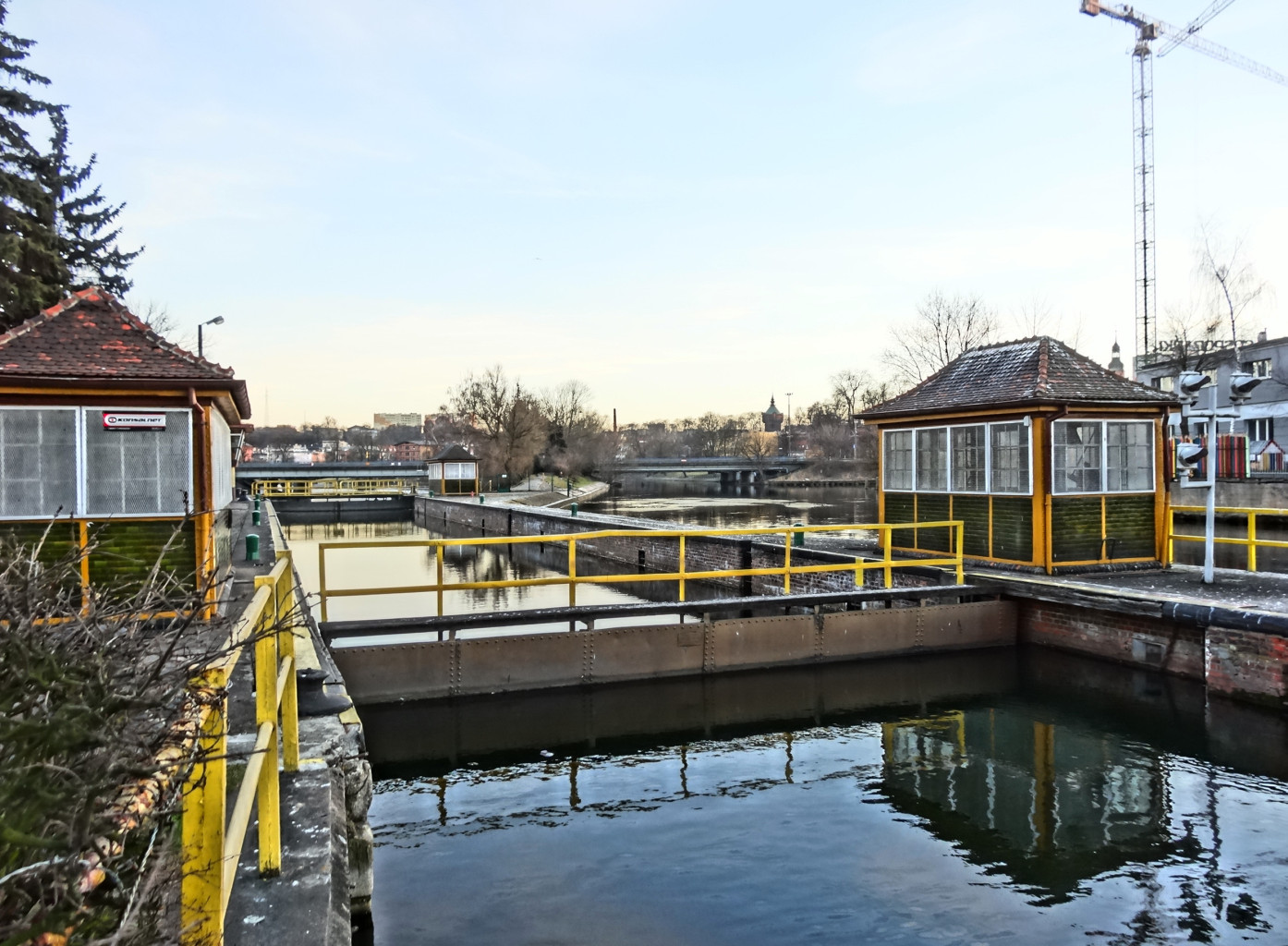
The city lock today

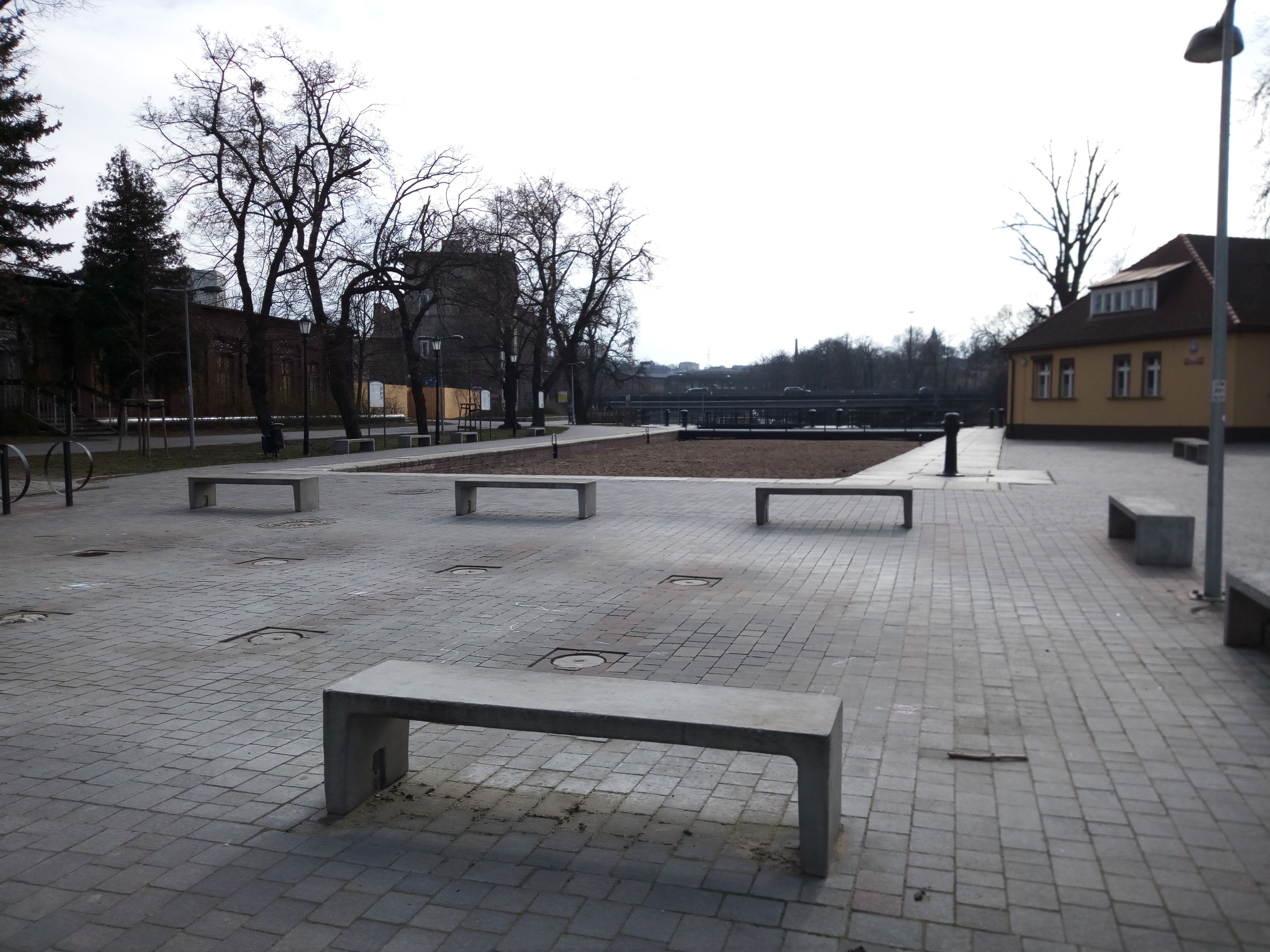
Sand filled trapezoidal lock viewed from the street

=== Tenement at 1 Marcinkowskiego ===
1914

Late Art Nouveau

This was one of the latest construction of the street in the 1910s, the plot being left unbuilt from the 1850s till that time. Commissioner was a merchant, Mr Gerner

The tenement boasts few details: cartouches ornamented with Art Nouveau vegetal motifs, a canted bay window on the left facade and a curved wall gable on its main frontage.

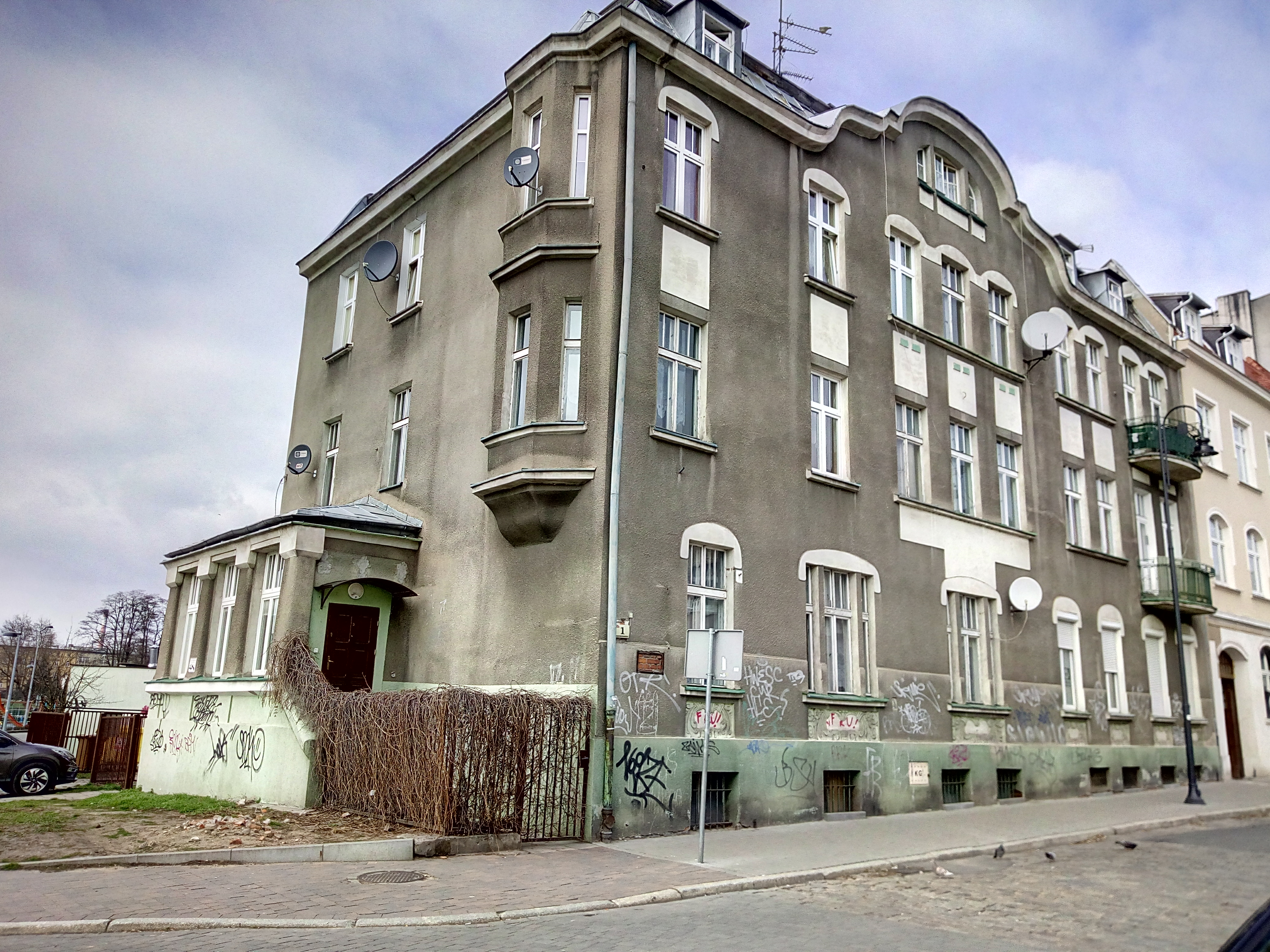
Corner view from the street

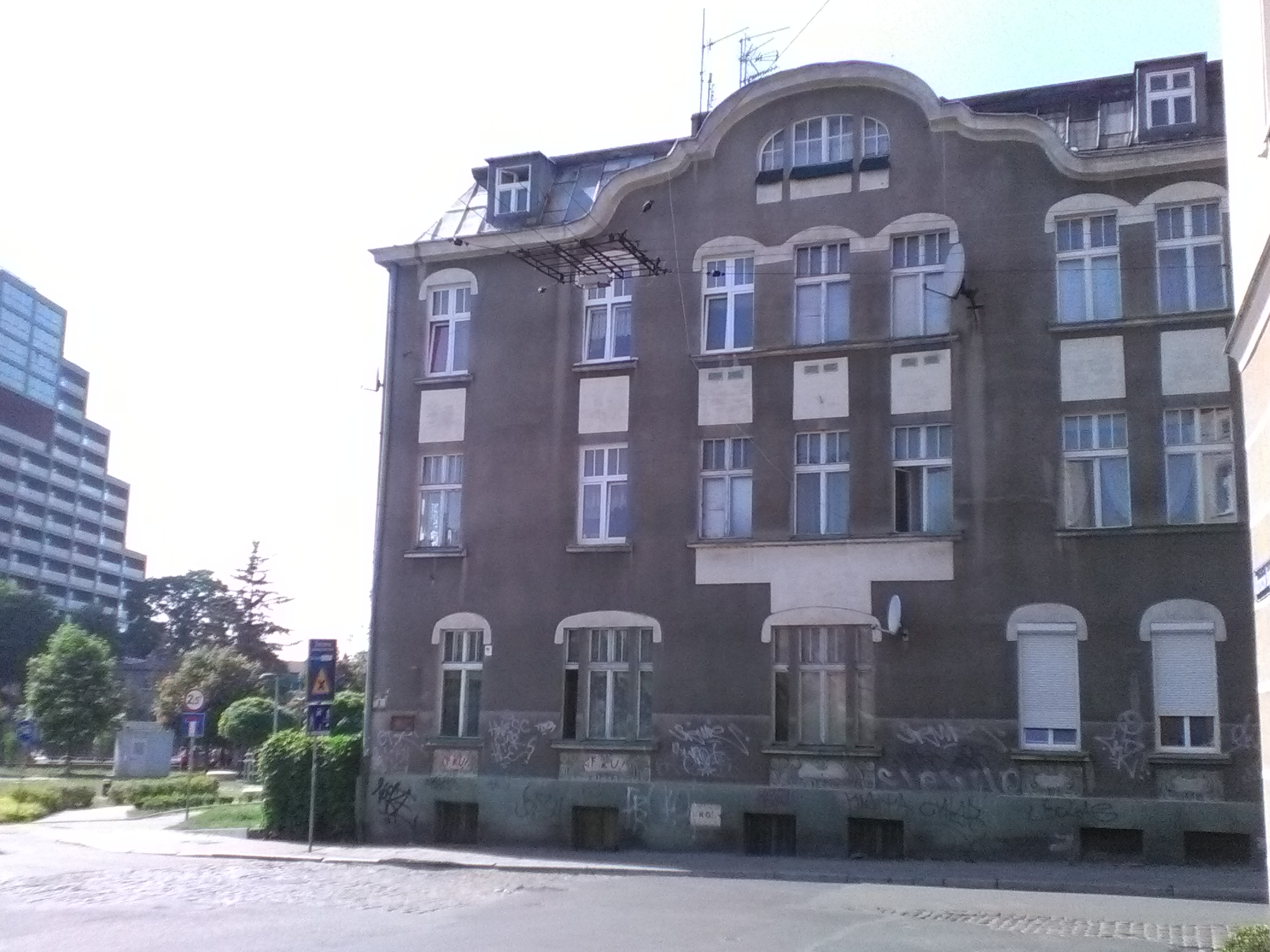
Main elevation

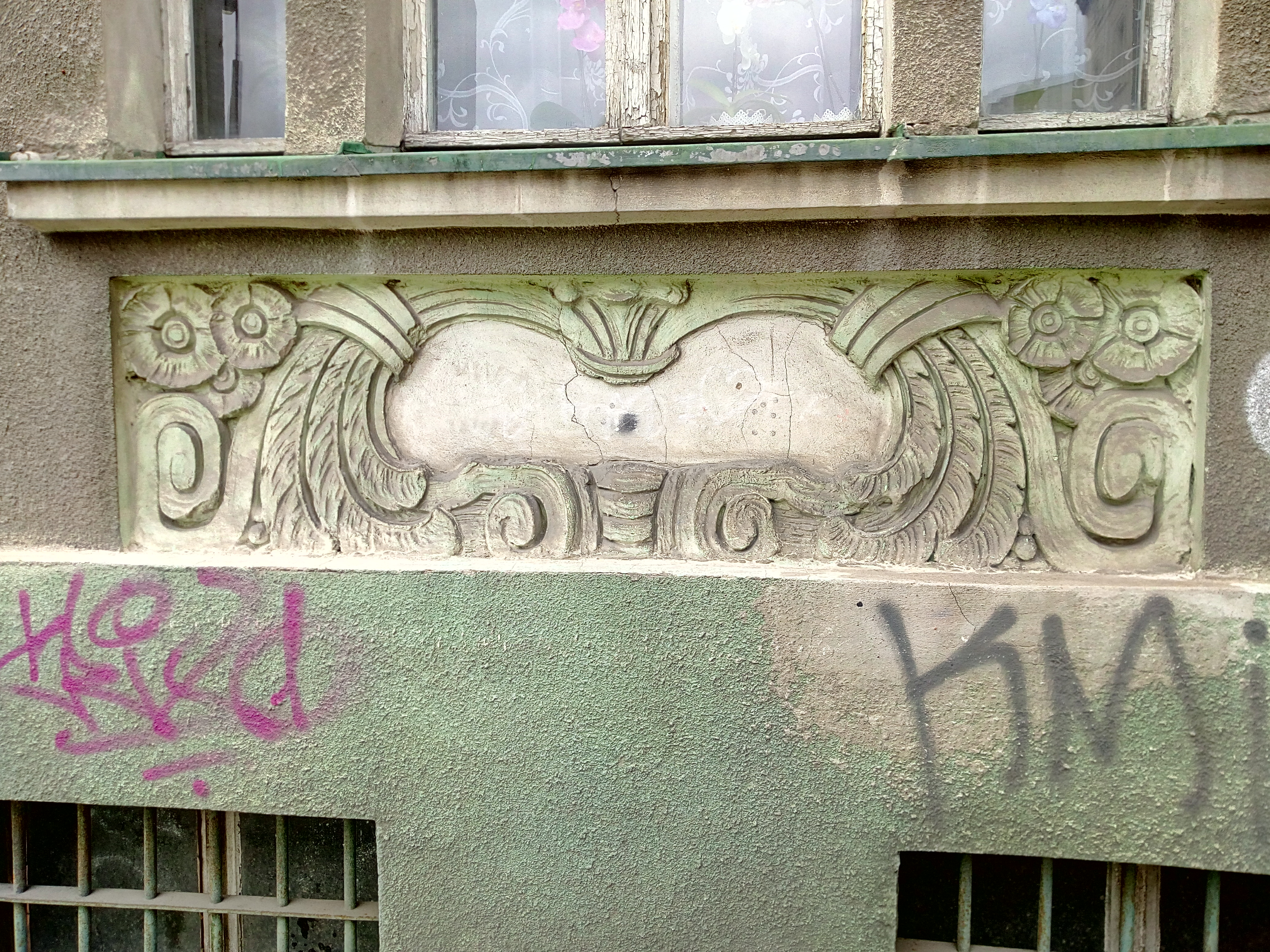
Adorned cartouche

=== Tenement at 2/4 Marcinkowskiego, corner with Focha street ===
1879-1880 (Nr.2)

These houses have been commissioned by the board of the Bydgoszcz Canal to house the handler of the water lock nearby (German: Schleuse meister). As such, they were originally located on Wilhelmstraße.

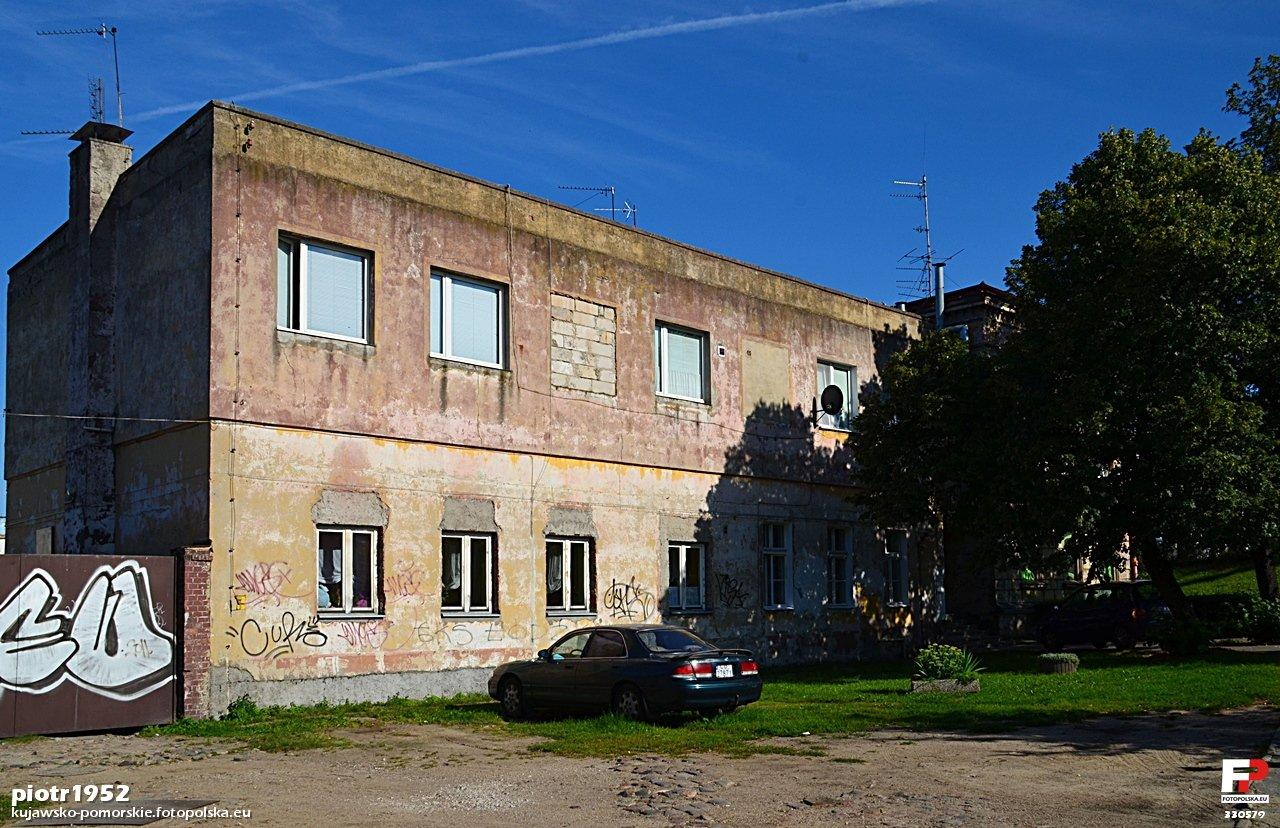
The derelict house at Nr.4

=== Tenement at 3 Marcinkowskiego ===
1906-1907

Late Art Nouveau

First owner of the tenement was a religious society (German: religionsgesellschaft), which had a chapel there.

The building has been entirely refurbished in 2008, revealing Art Nouveau details, wrought iron balconies, dormers on the top and large wooden entrance doors.

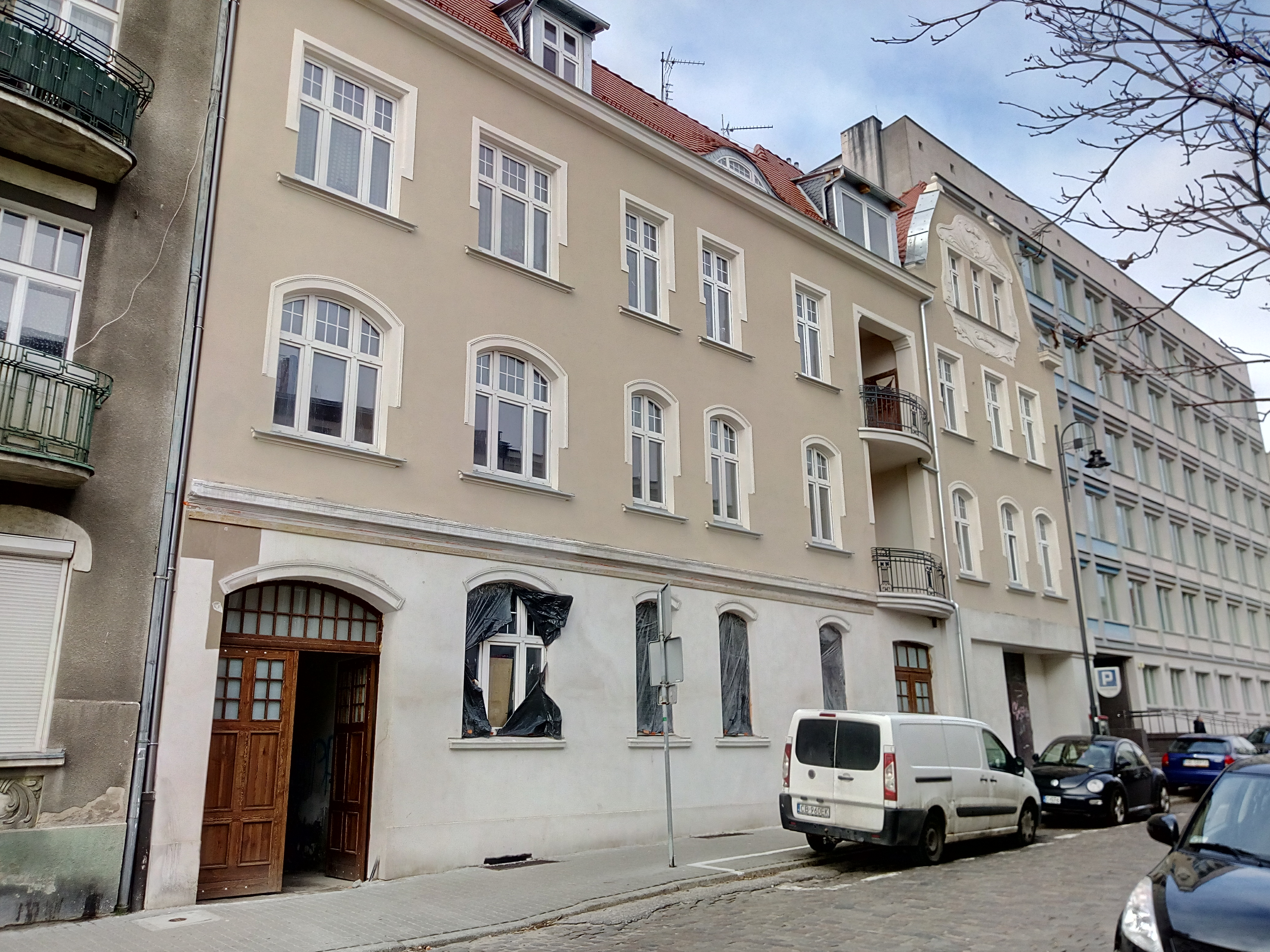
Main frontage after renovation

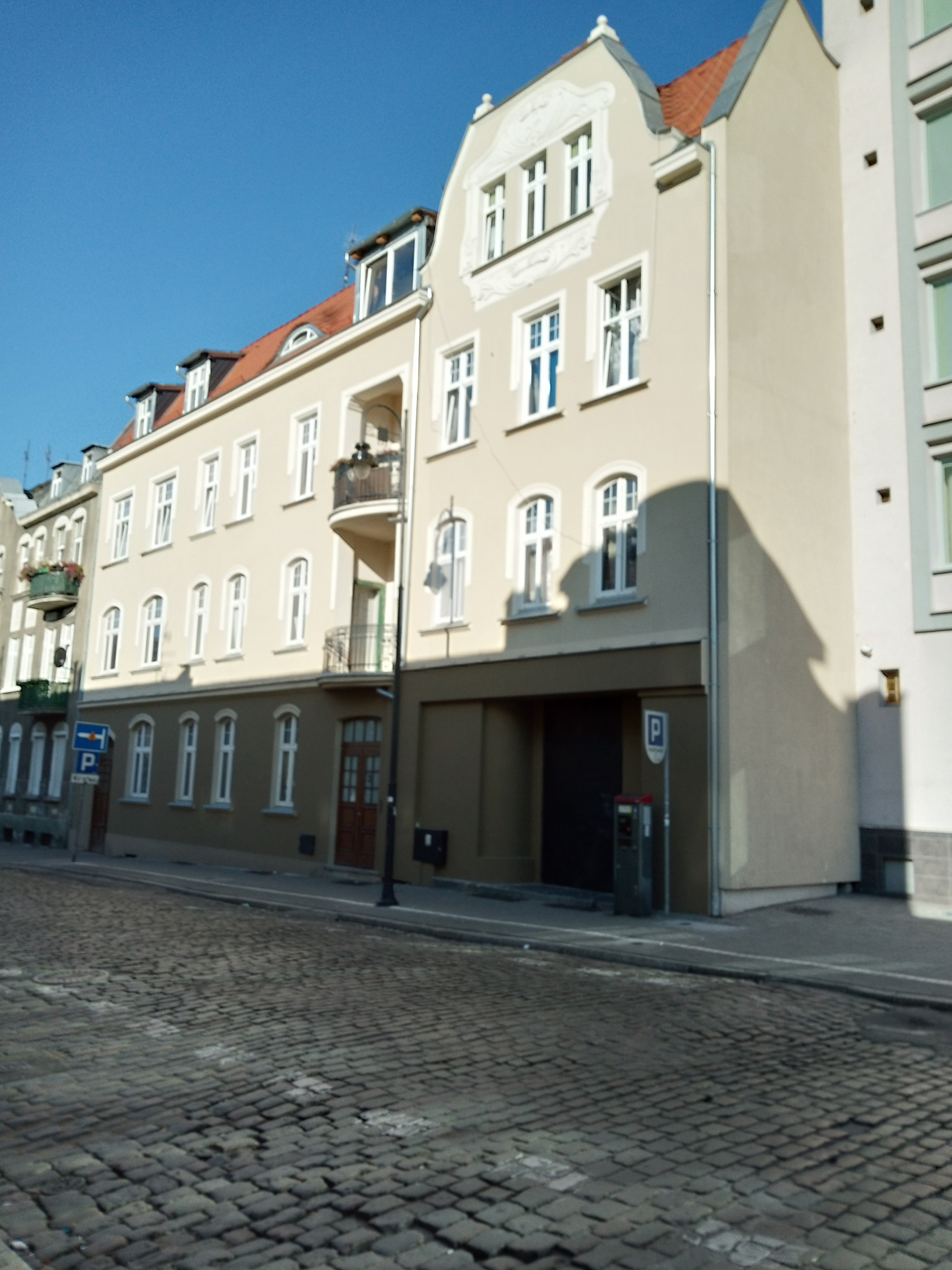
Elevation on the street

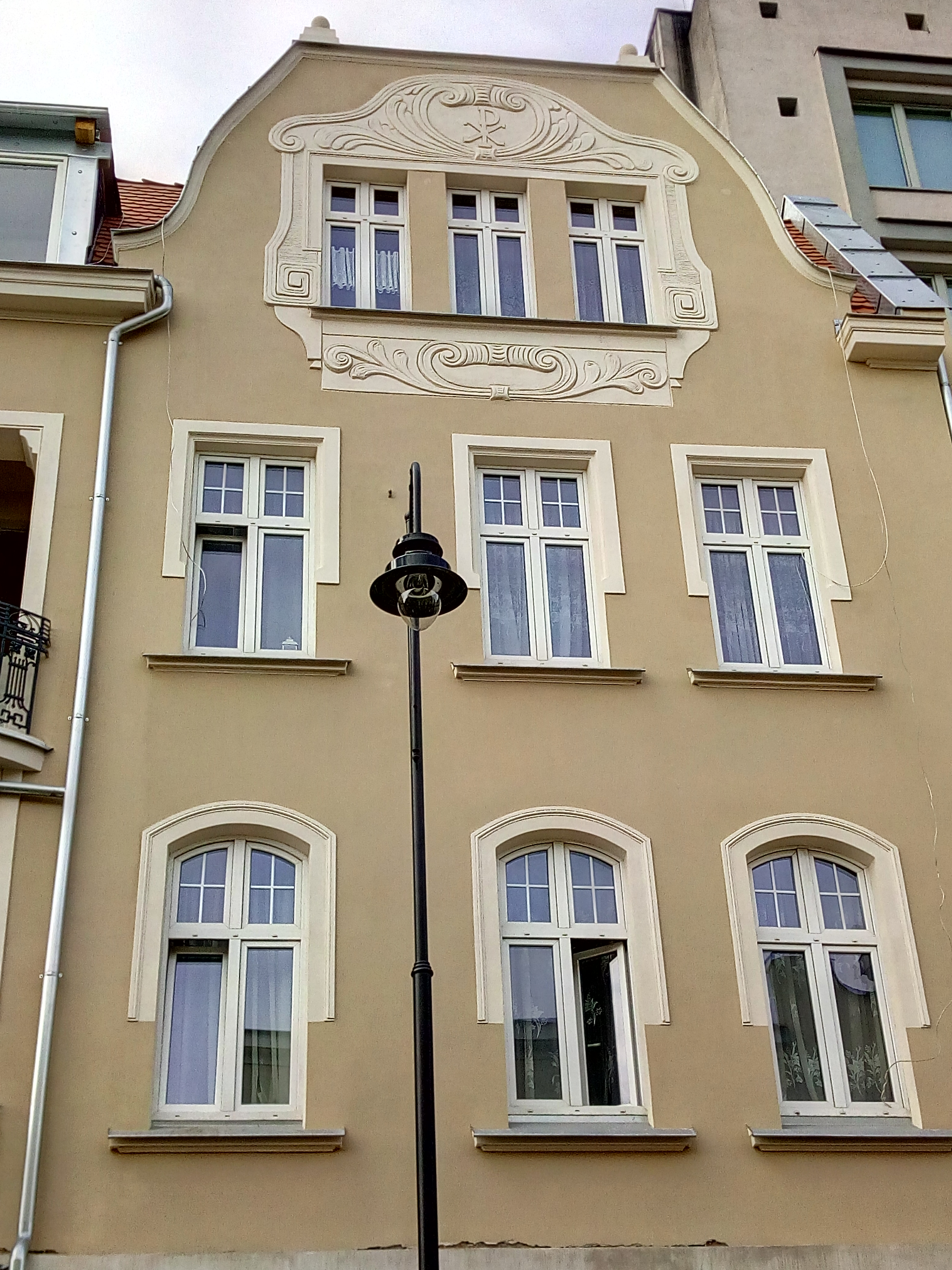
Gable top with Art Nouveau motifs

=== Former BEFANA factory at 6/8/10 Marcinkowskiego ===
1852

Industrial architecture

The site was first a river shipyard, established in 1885 by entrepreneur Leopold Zober, over an area of 0.5 ha, where initially were produced steam boilers and steam locomotives, machines and ship accessories. Taken over by Polish capital, the firm name was changed to Granobs and Kozłowski (1915), building black tools (spades, axes, pickaxes...) and files, to Bydgoska FAbryka NArzędzi (English: Bydgoszcz Factory of Files and Tools) in 1923, shortened to BEFANA. Between 1927 and 1939, BEFANA became the biggest file producer in Poland. The company also produced forged tools (hammers, pincer pliers, etc.), in majority to the benefit of the agricultural market.

During World War II the factory's military administration dedicated the production to the army, but no sooner than on February 14, 1945, after the liberation of Bydgoszcz, the factory resumed its regular production. On October 1, 1989, the firm was transformed into a joint venture with foreign capital and changed its name to Befana-Vis, exporting to many European, African and Asian countries as well as American markets. In 2008, new CEO Witold Kaczyński moved the company's headquarters from downtown to a modern production hall in the newly established Bydgoszcz Industrial and Technological Park. The historic site was left abandoned: partly razed, only few buildings still stand today as witness of the feverish industrial age of the place. On May 30, 2019, the city of Bydgoszcz has made known the company in charge of the rewamping of the abandoned lot: AWZ Deweloper. The design will comprise habitation building as well as offices.

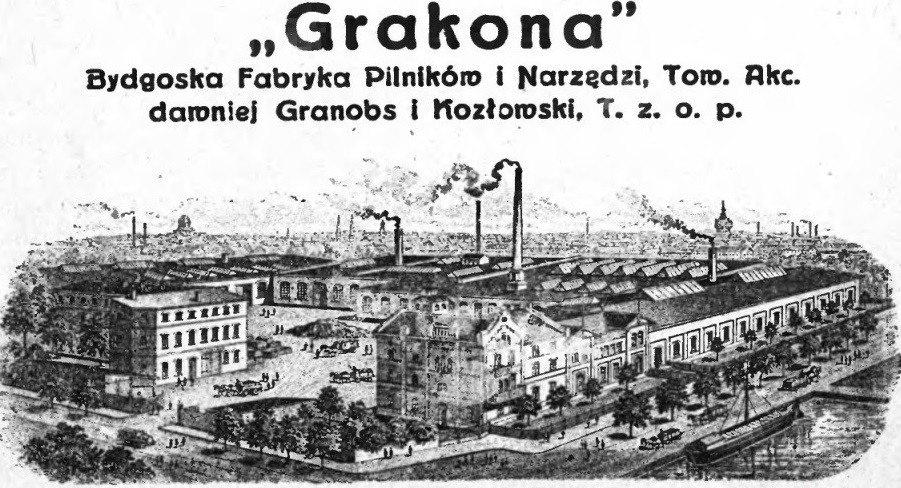
19th century picture of the first factory

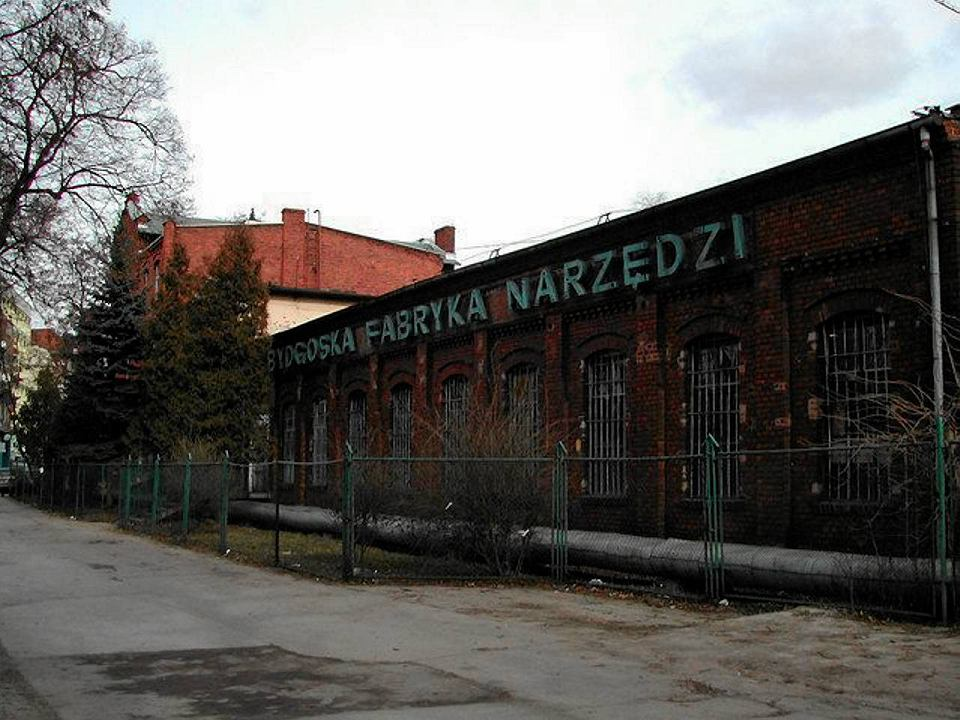
Former factory building ca 2009

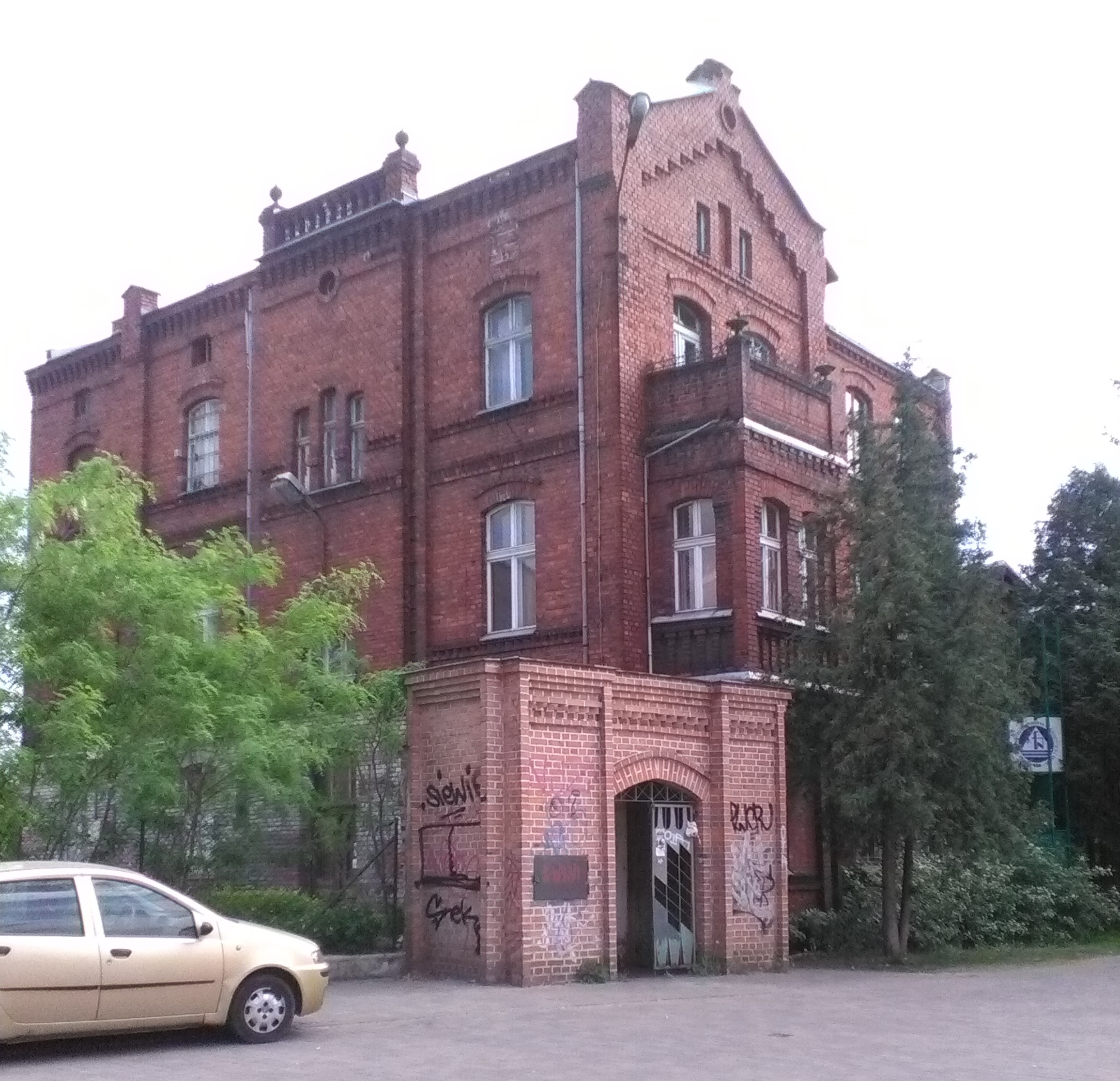
Factory building

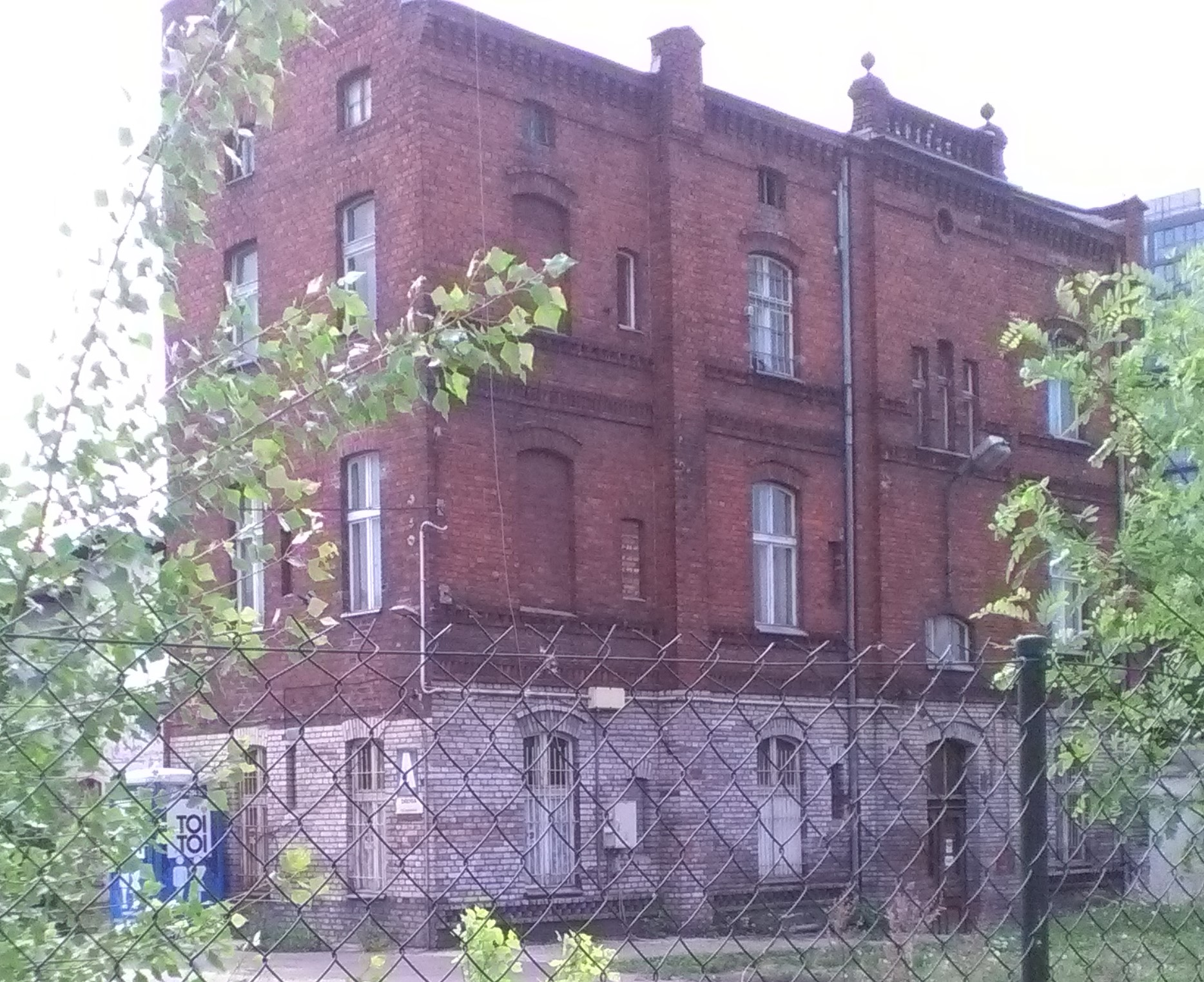
Left building from the street

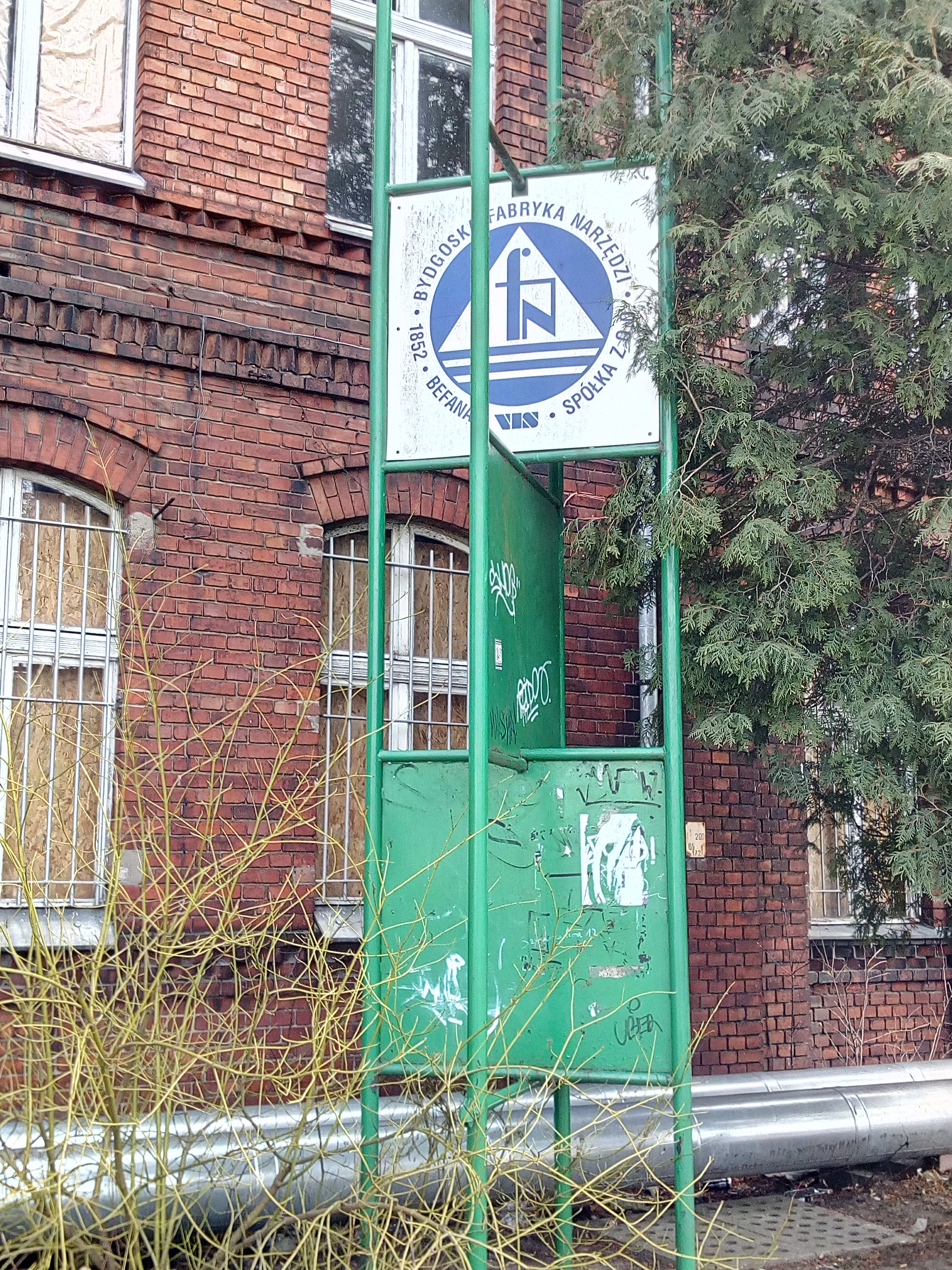
Former BEFANA signpost on Marcinkowskiego street

=== Tenement at 9 Marcinkowskiego ===
1905–1906, by Erich Lindenburger

Art Nouveau

The building still possesses beautifully preserved Art Nouveau elements: loggias, balconies and a wooden entrance door topped with a superb adornment portraying a woman face around the oval transom light.

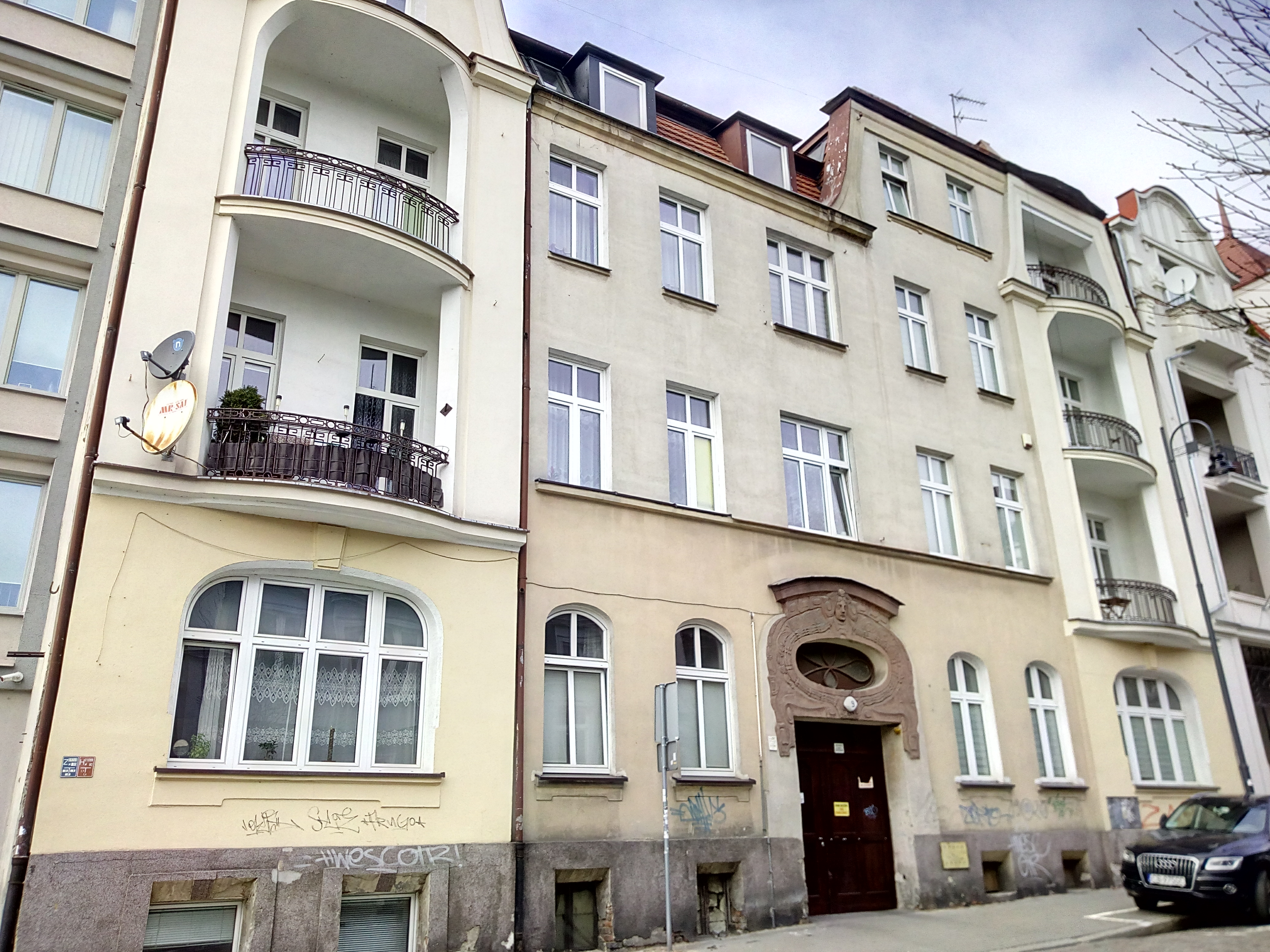
Main frontage

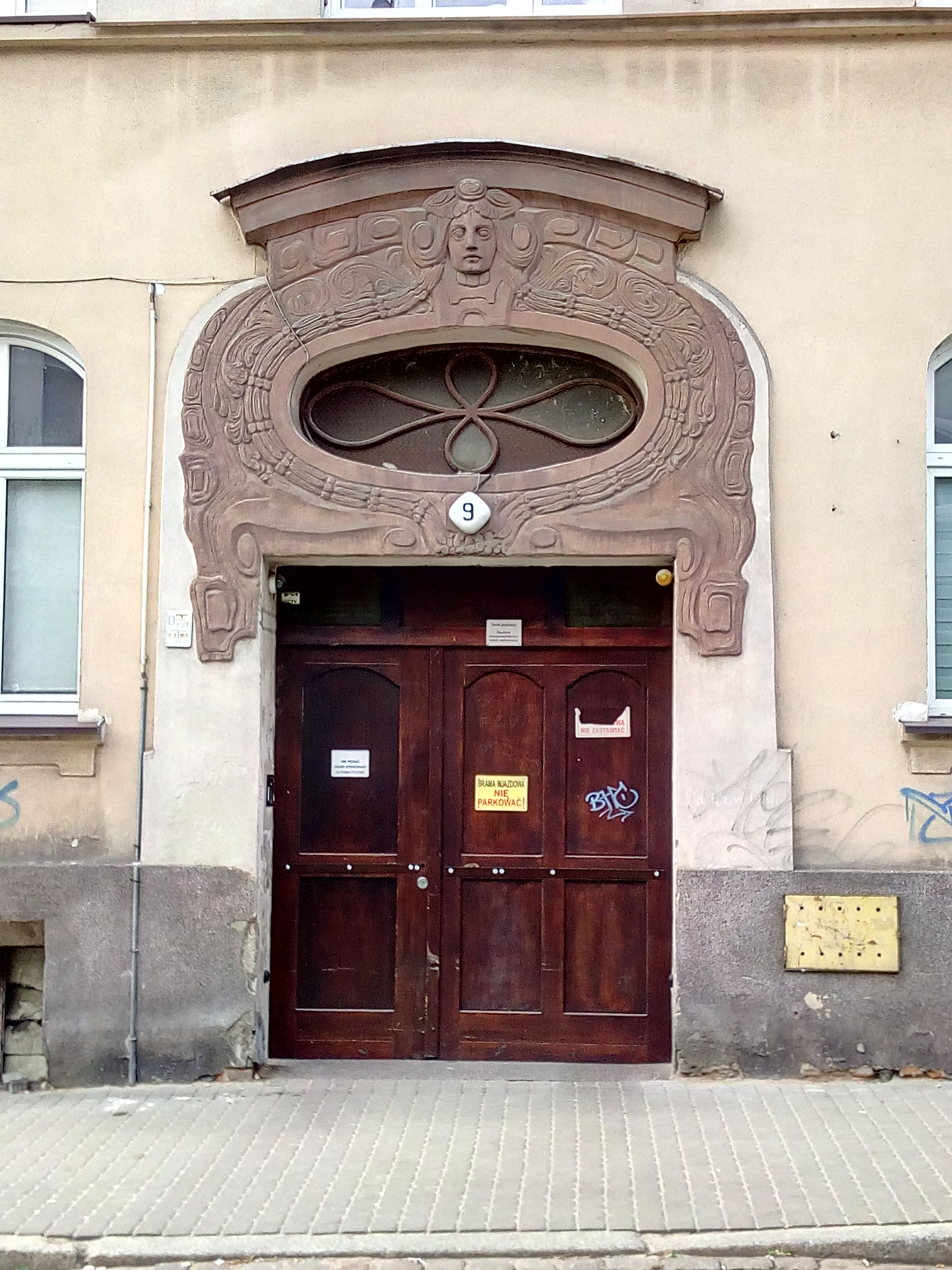
Art Nouveau motif above the main door

=== Tenement at 16 Obrońców Bydgoszczy, corner with Marcinkowskiego ===
1875-1900

Eclecticism & Neo-classicism

First known owner was Emil Großmann, a geometer, in 1880. At the time, the building was referenced under the crossing street addressing, then Fischerstraße 6, since Petesonstraße (Obrońców Bydgoszczy street) was only being built. His widow, then his son August kept the ownership of the house till 1900. In the early 1910s, the edifice has been housing a restaurant run by Carl Bartz for several decades. It is still the case today.

Despite a recent renovation, few architectural elements sustained the test of time.

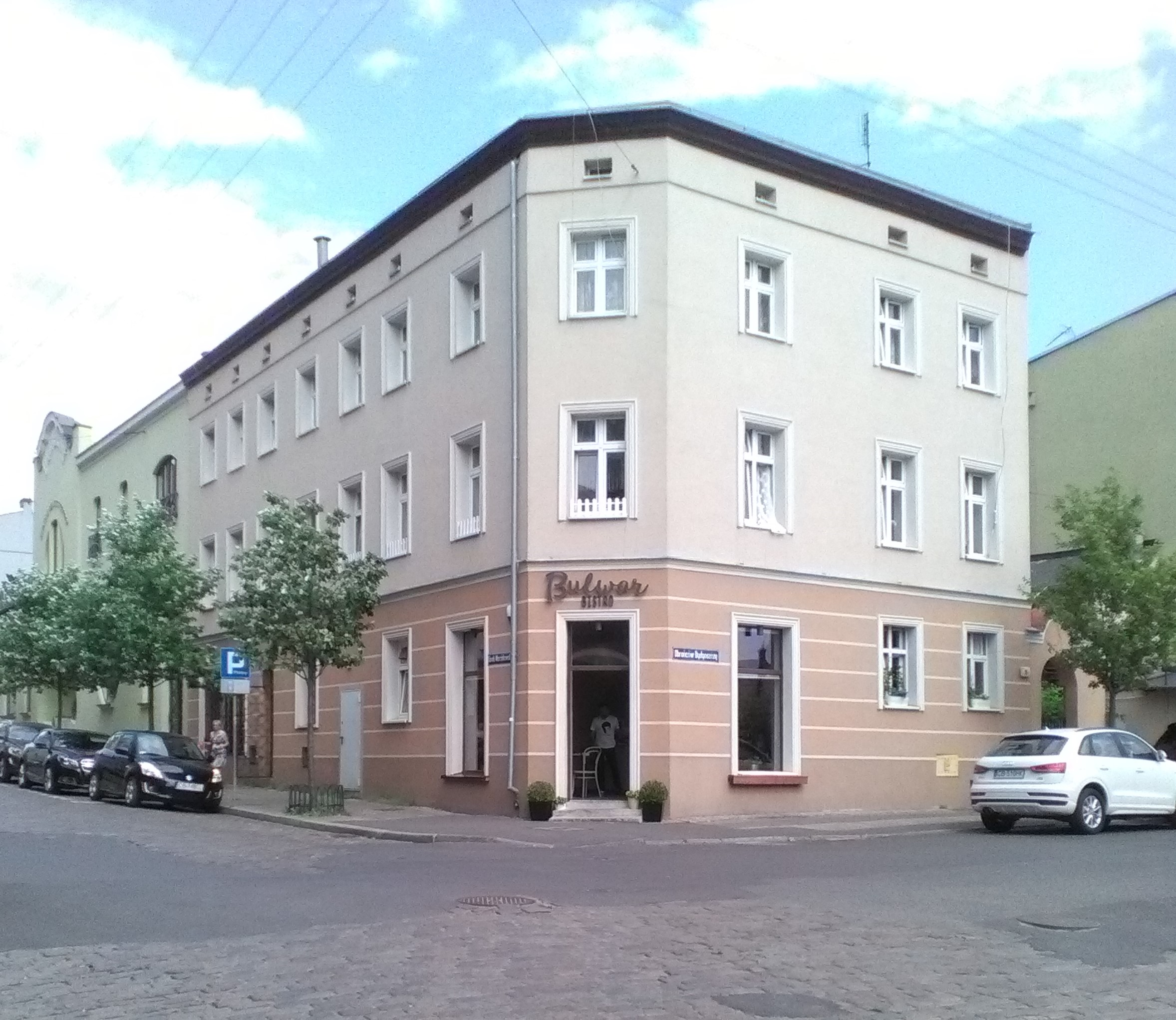
View from the street

=== Tenement at 11 Marcinkowskiego ===
1904-1905

Late Art Nouveau, early modern architecture

One of the largest building of the street, it boasts distinctive elements: loggias, balconies including wrought iron fencing or stuccoed decoration, a middle avant-corps, while the roof displays various dormers and finial.

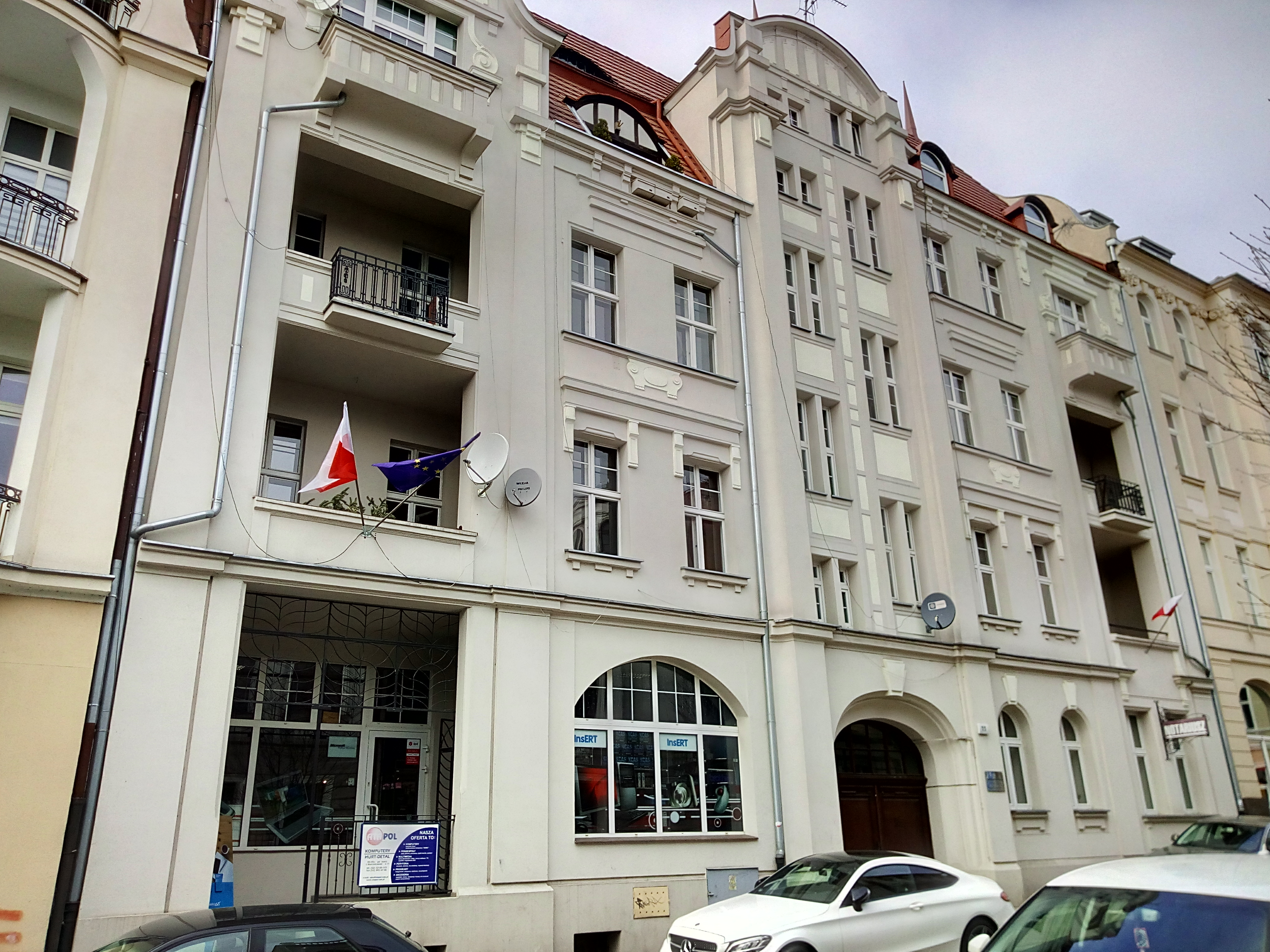
Main frontage

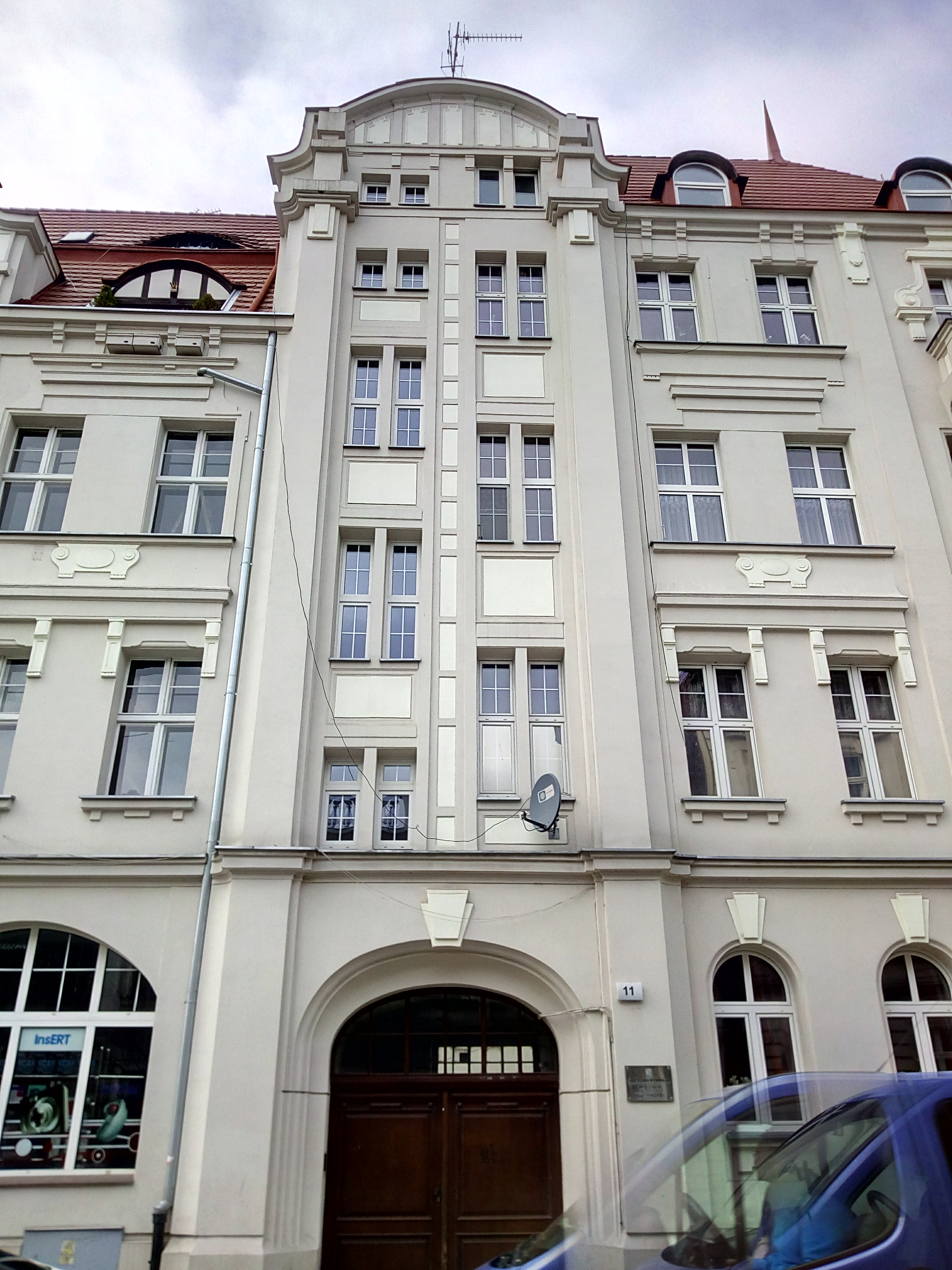
Avant-corps and roof finials

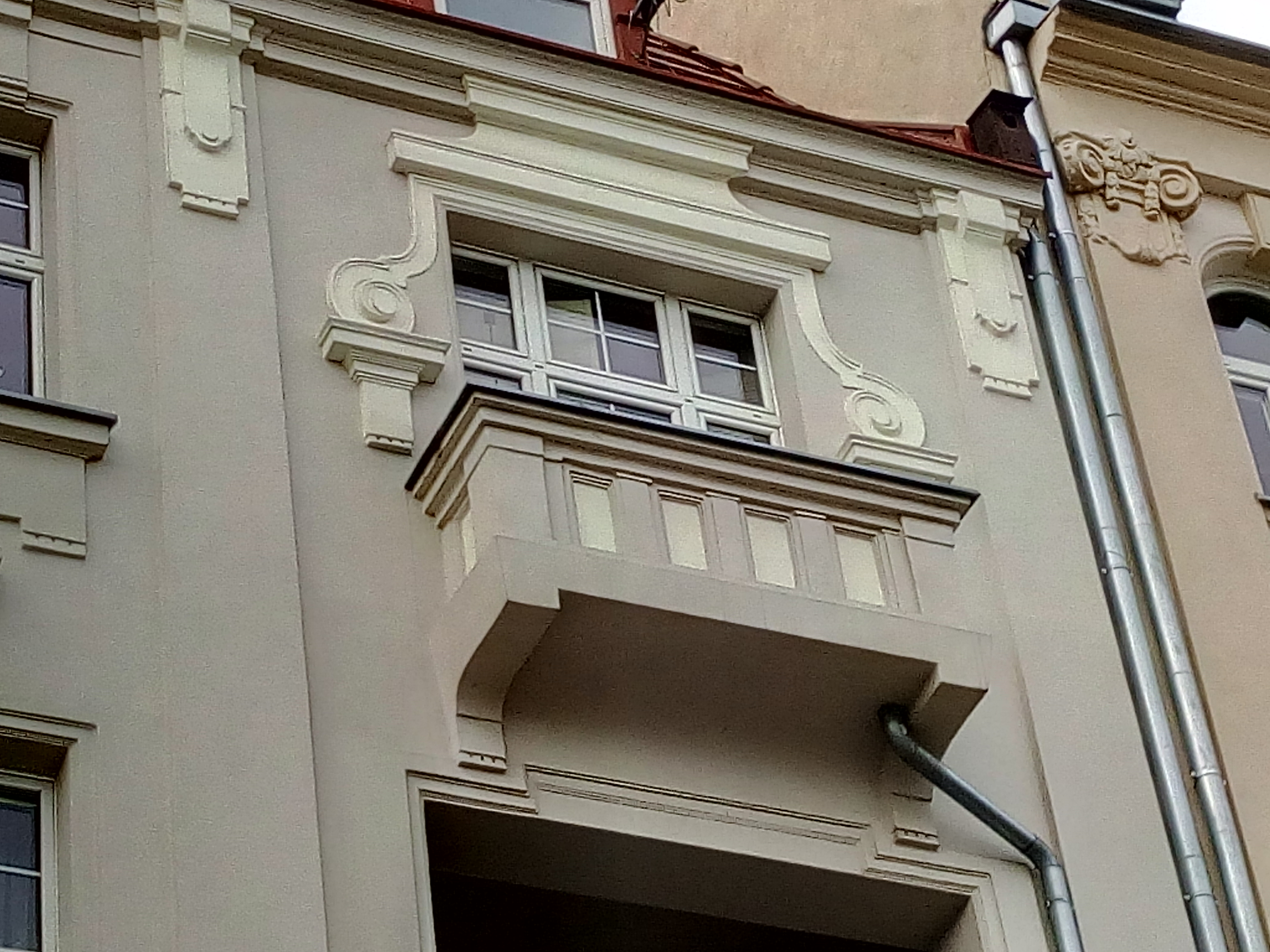
Details of an adorned balcony

=== Bydgoszcz Cultural Center at 12/14/16 Marcinkowskiego ===
End of the 1920s

Late Art Nouveau, Secession architecture

The architectural ensemble has been erected first as a cinema, called Oko (transl. Eye) which opened in 1929 with a capacity of 600 seats. When talking movies became the reference, the place took the name of Rewia in 1933, then Kapitol before WWII. During German occupation, Nazi authorities kept this naming. After the war, the activity was restarted as Orzeł (transl. Eagle) and has been running till 2002, when, outdated, it had to close. In 2011, Bydgoszcz City decided to take over the building: after having undergone a thorough renovation, it now houses the city Cultural Center (Polish: Miejskie Centrum kultury or MCK). The place comprises a cinema house, still called Orzeł.

Inspired by the Vienna Secession, the facade is covered with linear ornamentation in a form commonly called whiplash. One can notice various organic forms, with rich stylized floral compositions (stuccos ornamenting the window) and a profusion of curvilinear, sinuous patterns (openings, gable above the main entrance).

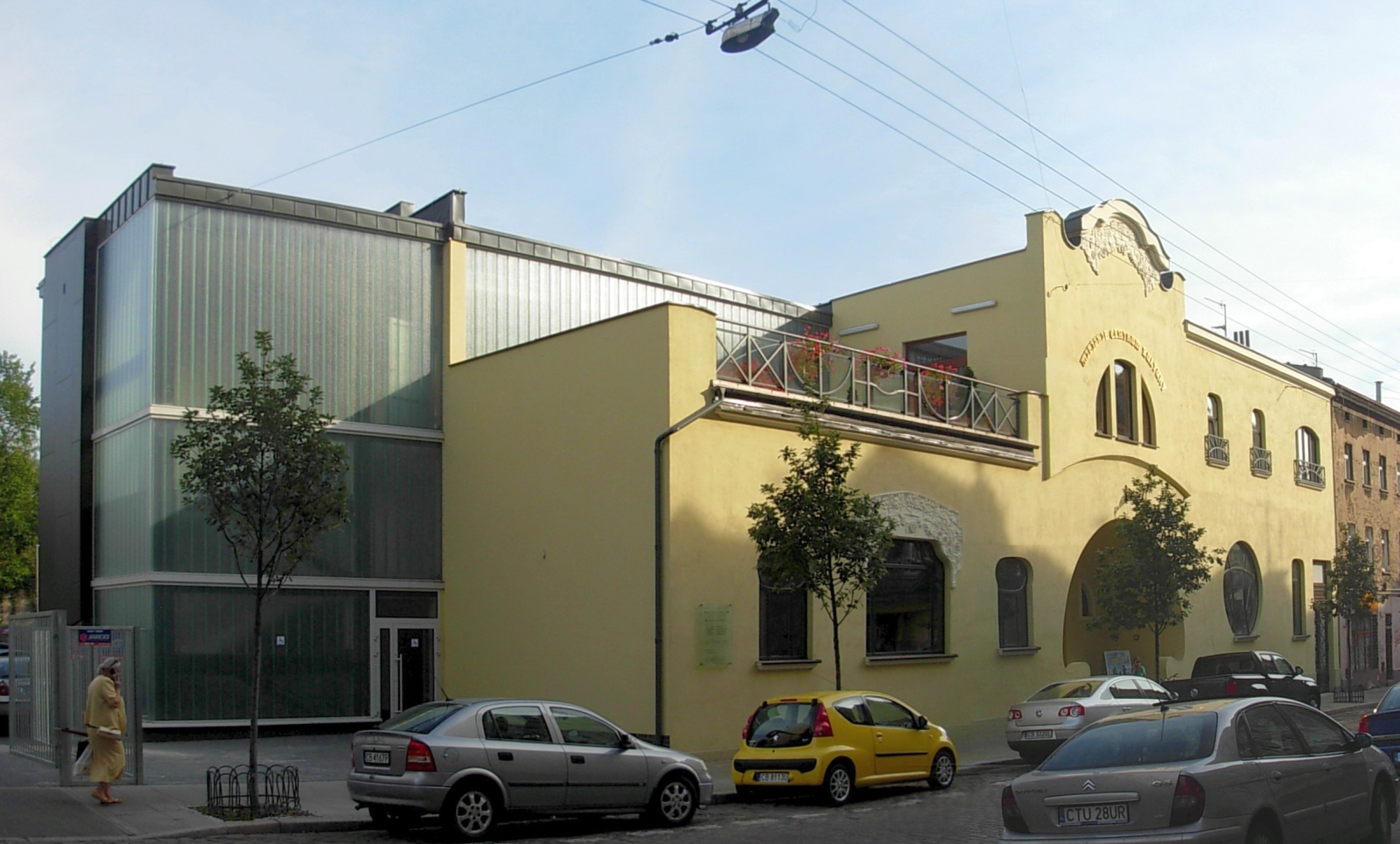
View of the building ensemble

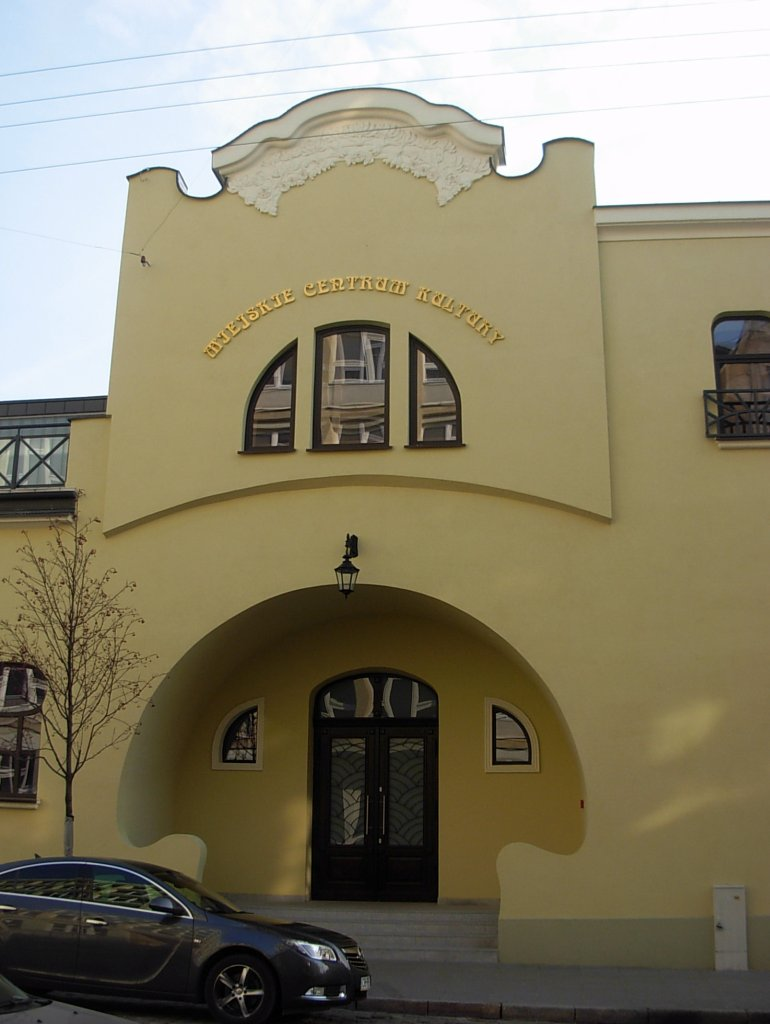
MAin entrance

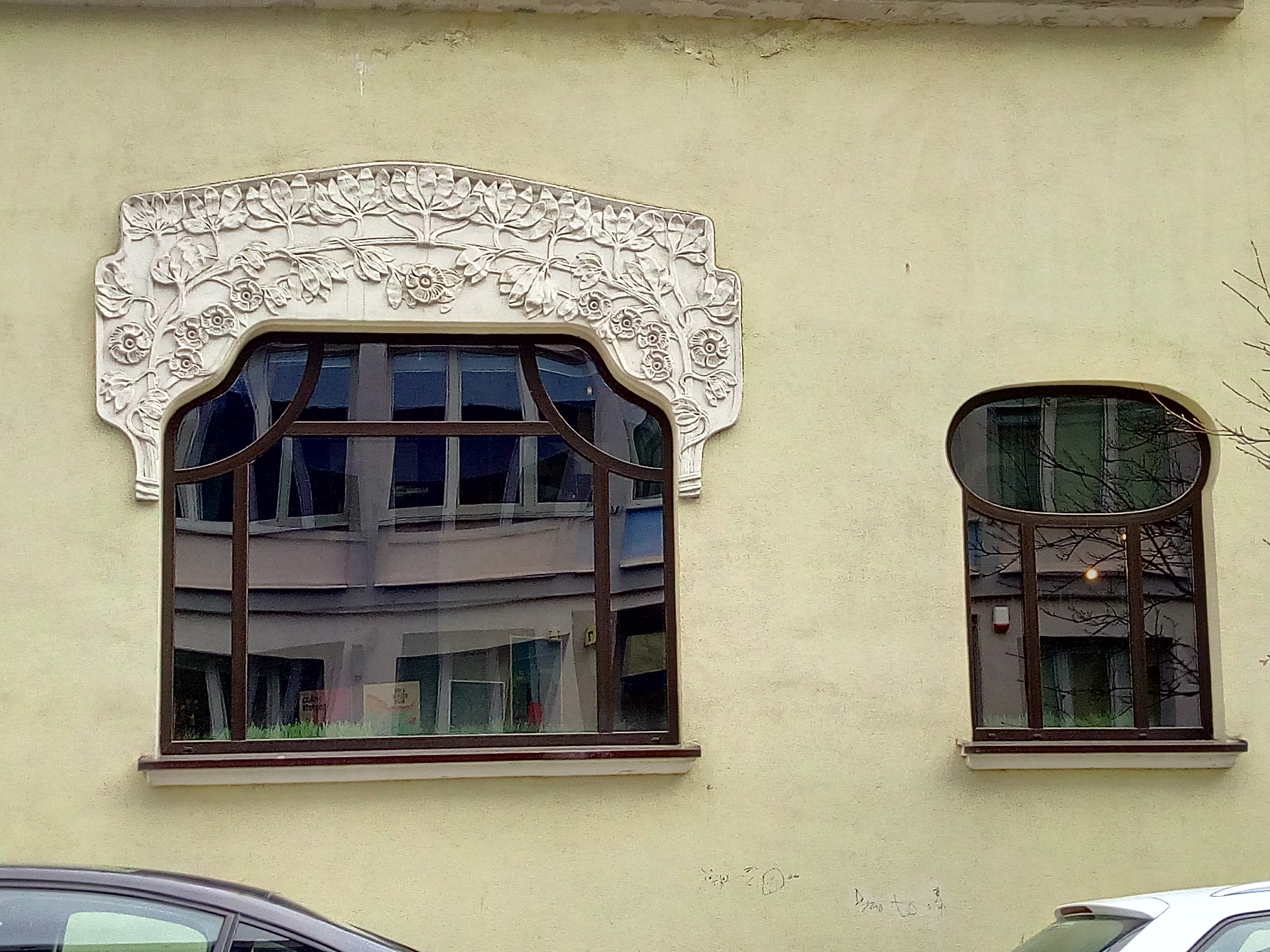
Secession details

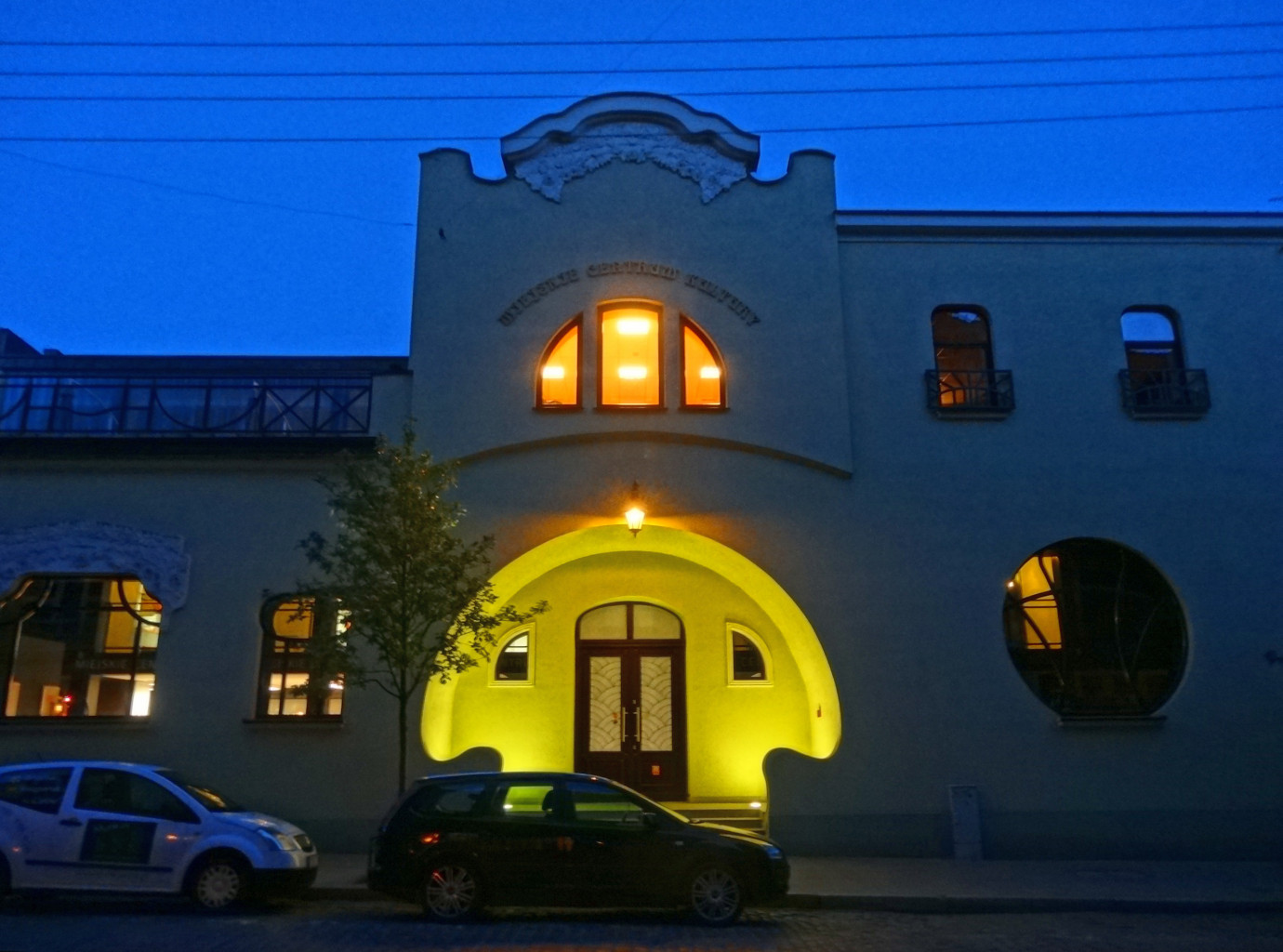
By night

=== Tenement at 41 Dworcowa Street, corner with Marcinkowskiego street ===
1904, by Erich Lindenburger

Eclecticism

Franz Muhme, a mason, was the first owner of the actual building then at Bahnhoffstraße 18: he was mainly renting rooms. In the 1910s, the house was divided into five properties, which landlords were: Mr. Meyer and Mr Giefe, rentiers not living in Bromberg, Hermann Lemke, a baker who had his shop there, Jahnke Jr., an engineer and Wilhelm Tornow, a mechanic.

Facades, renovated in 2015, have Neo-Baroque and early Modernism elements. The architect varied the effects to render the asymmetry: bay window, corner terrace and balconies, cartouches, eyelid dormer on the corner but a row of shed dormers on the roof giving onto Dworcowa Street. The house lost one of its corner tower during a fire.

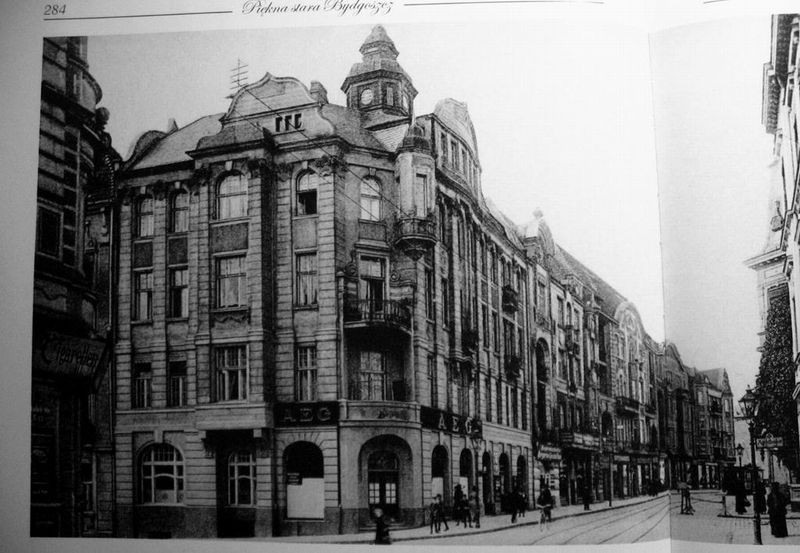
View ca 1930

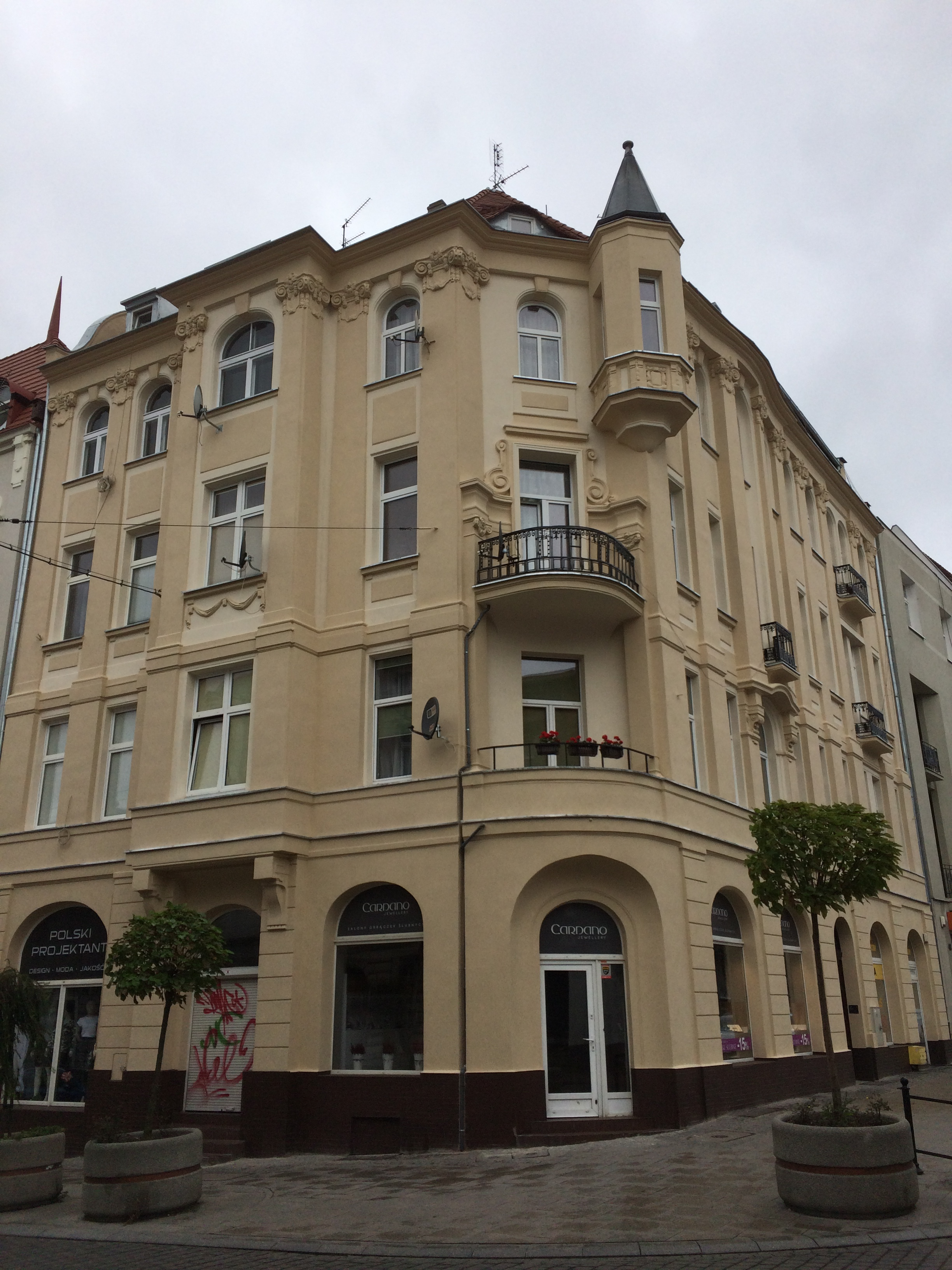
Facades on Dworcowa and Marcinkowski Street

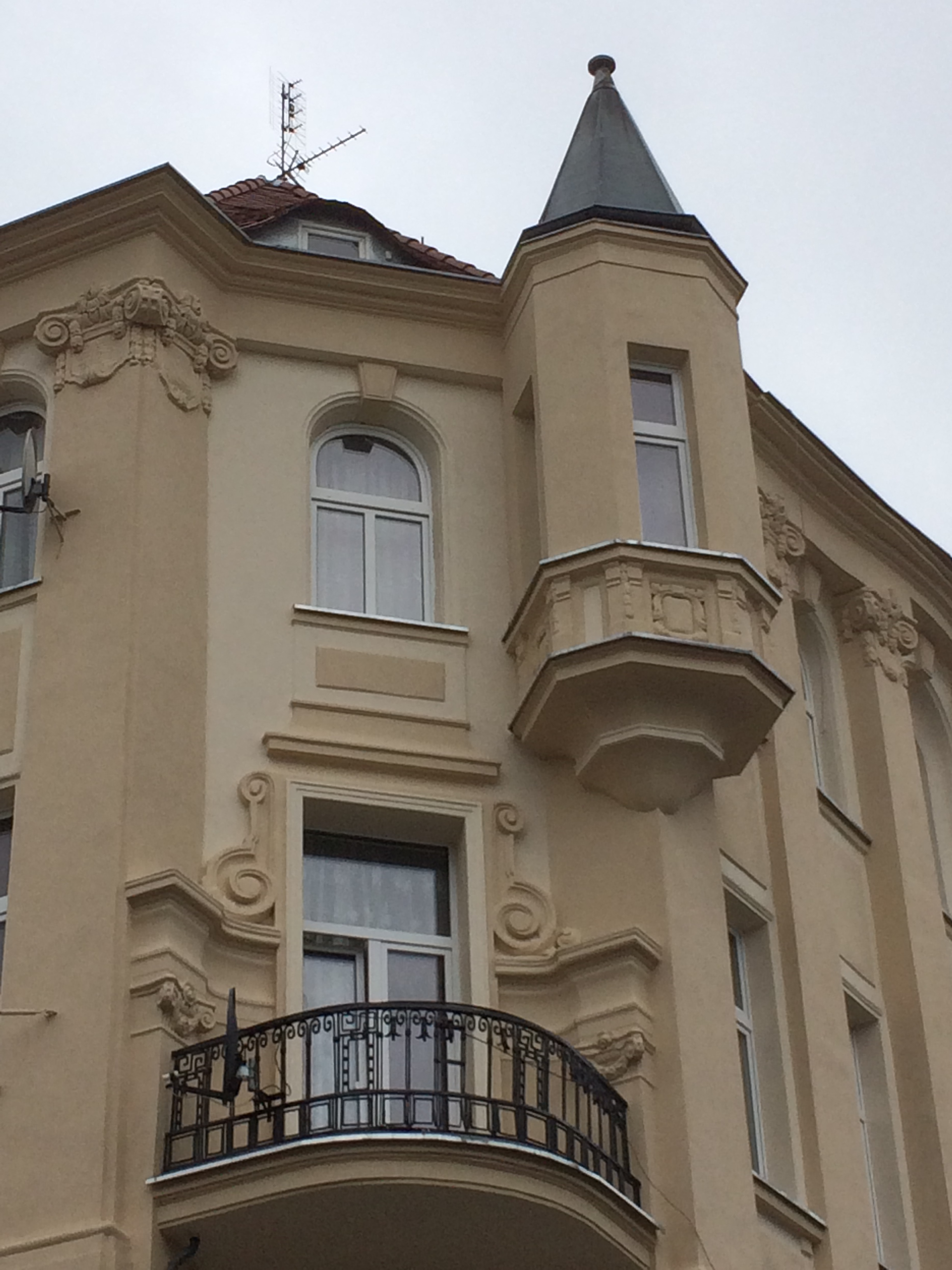
Detail of the corner tower

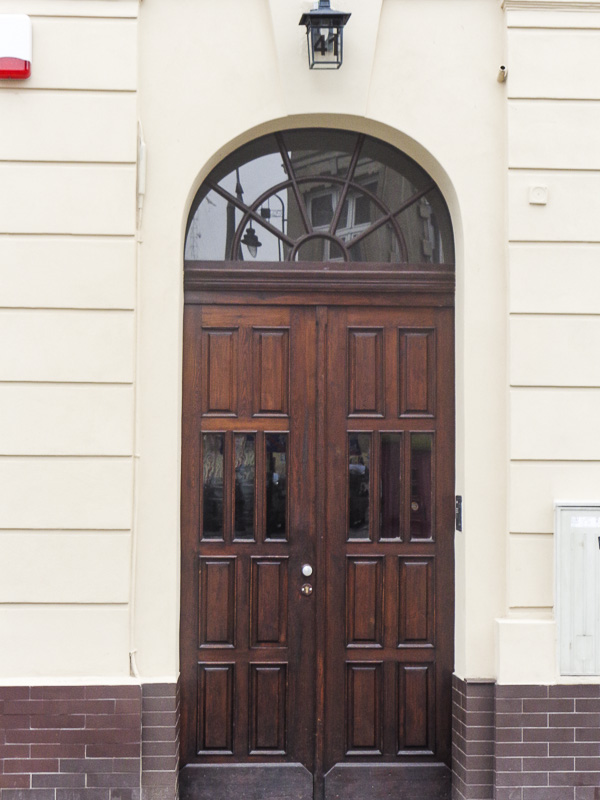
Main gate

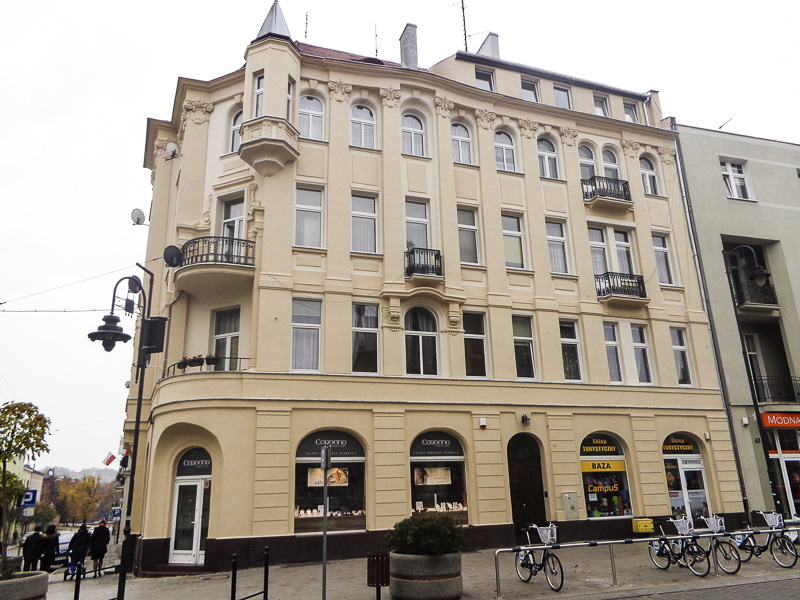
Elevation on Dworcowa street

=== Tenement at 18 Marcinkowskiego ===
1875-1900

Eclecticism, Neoclassical architecture

First registered in the 1878 phone book of the city, the tenement had housed a restaurant from 1900 till the outbreak of WWI.

The frontage exhibits typical neoclassic elements, with a balance composition. One can highlight the remarkable wooden carved door giving onto the street.

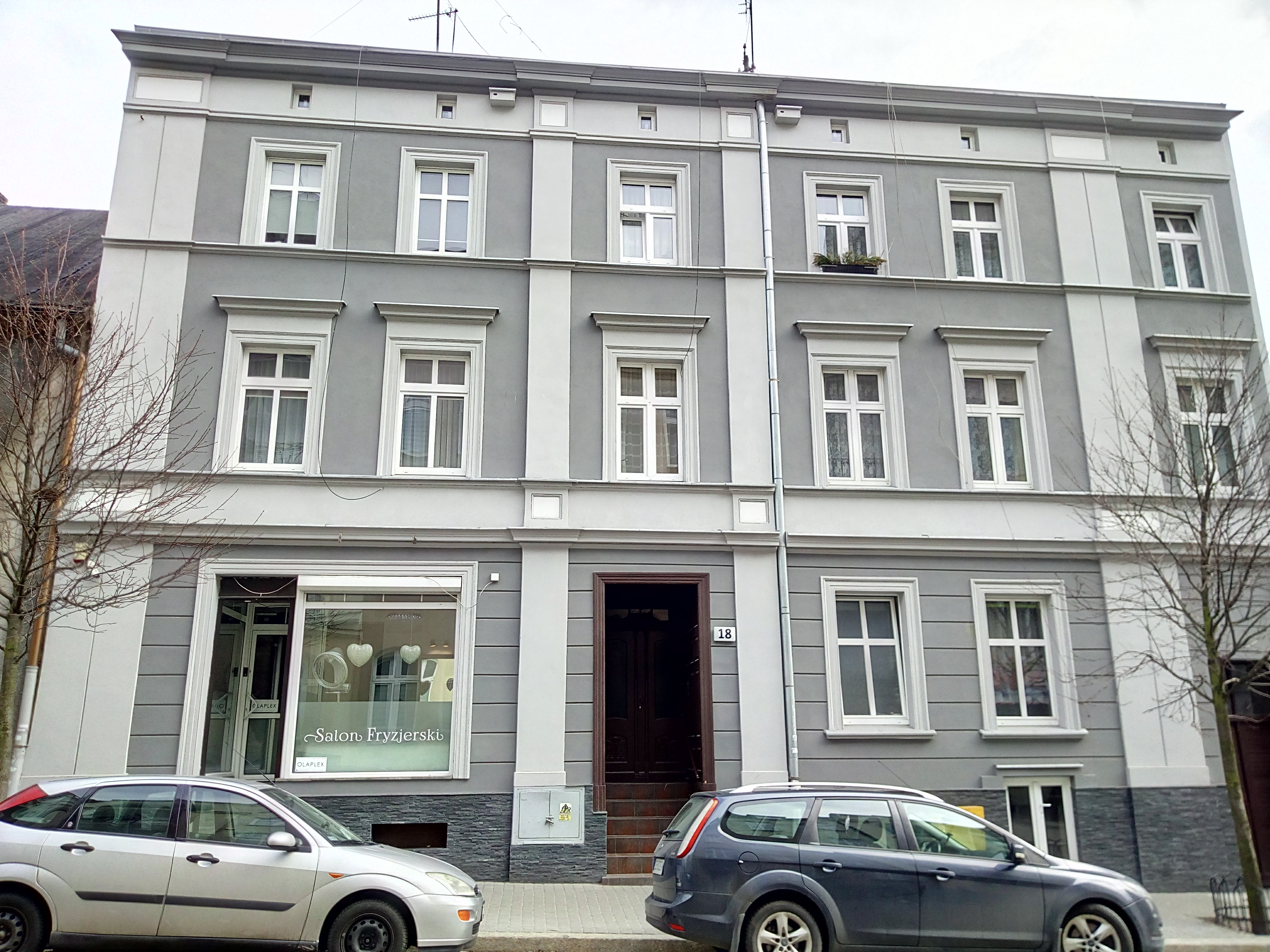
Main elevation

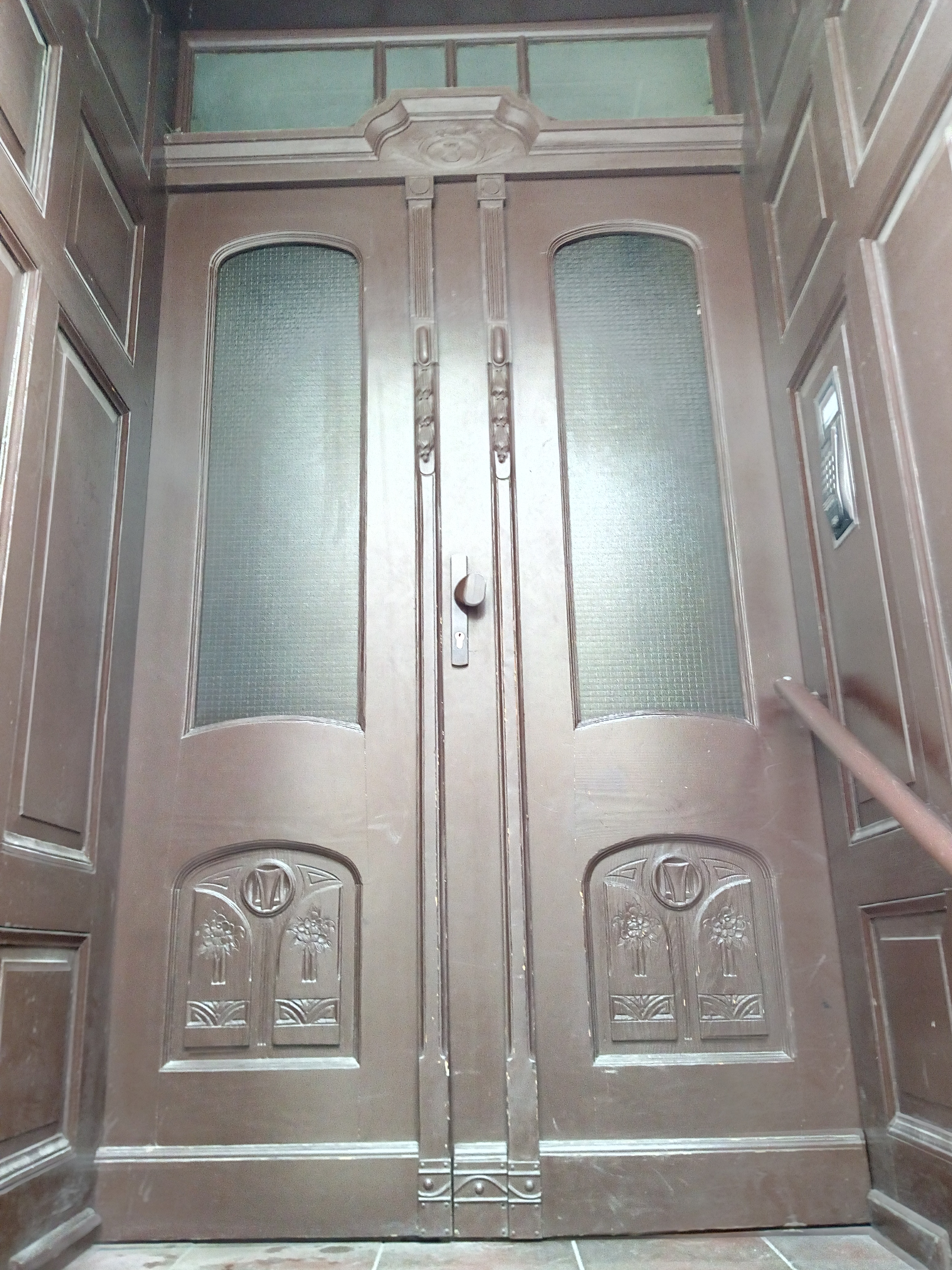
Entrance door

=== Tenement at 22 Marcinkowskiego ===
1883

Eclecticism, Neoclassical architecture

Like the building at Nr.18, this tenement also housed a restaurant from 1900 till the outbreak of WWI. It was registered initially at Fischerstraße 1.

While the main frontage displays regular neoclassic elements, apart from the rooftop balustrade, the main singularity lies in the tower on the left side. This noticeable addition includes a hexagonal-shaped peak, adorned with six round top windows, crowned by an ogee roof and a finial.

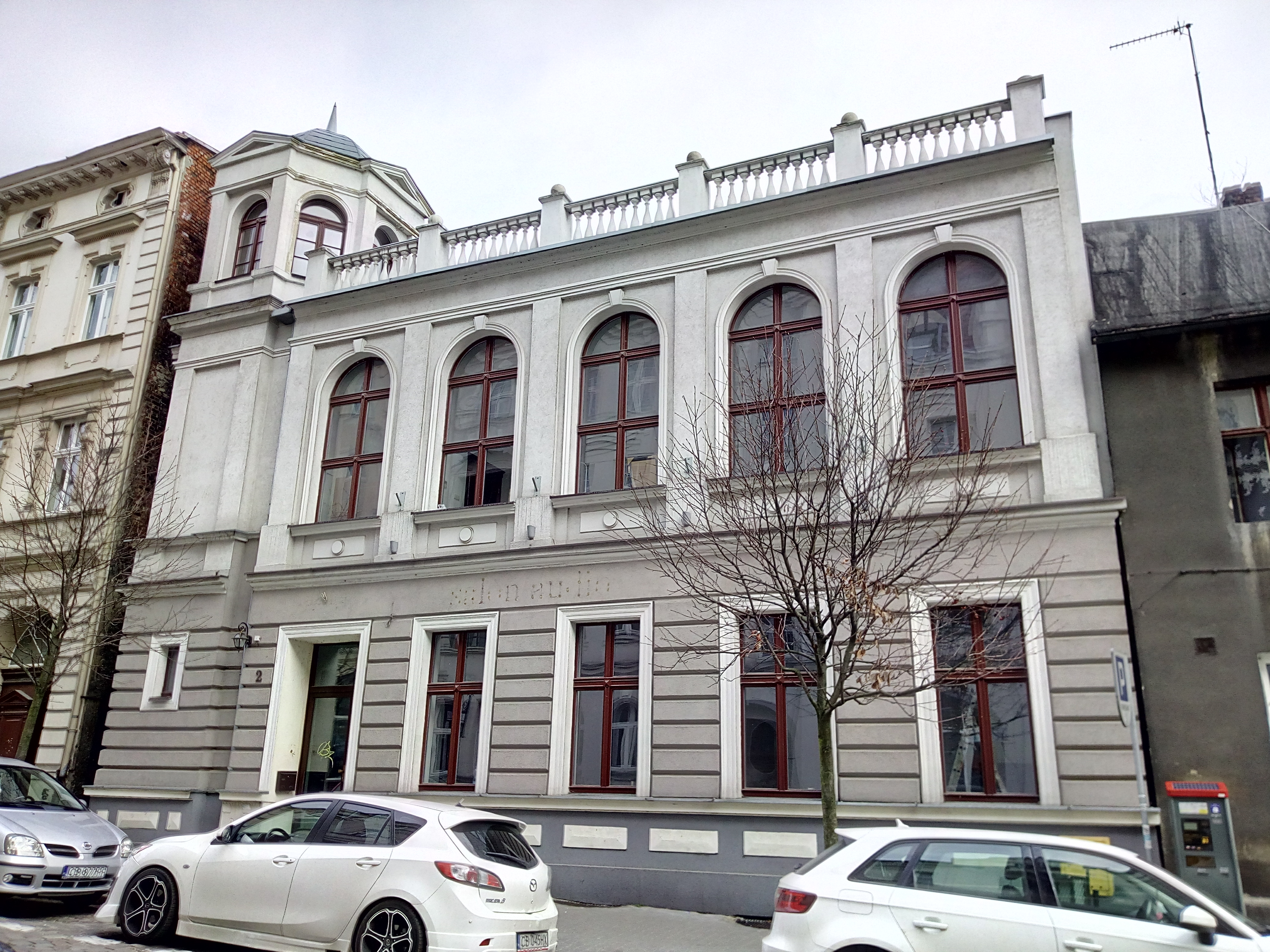
Main elevation from the street

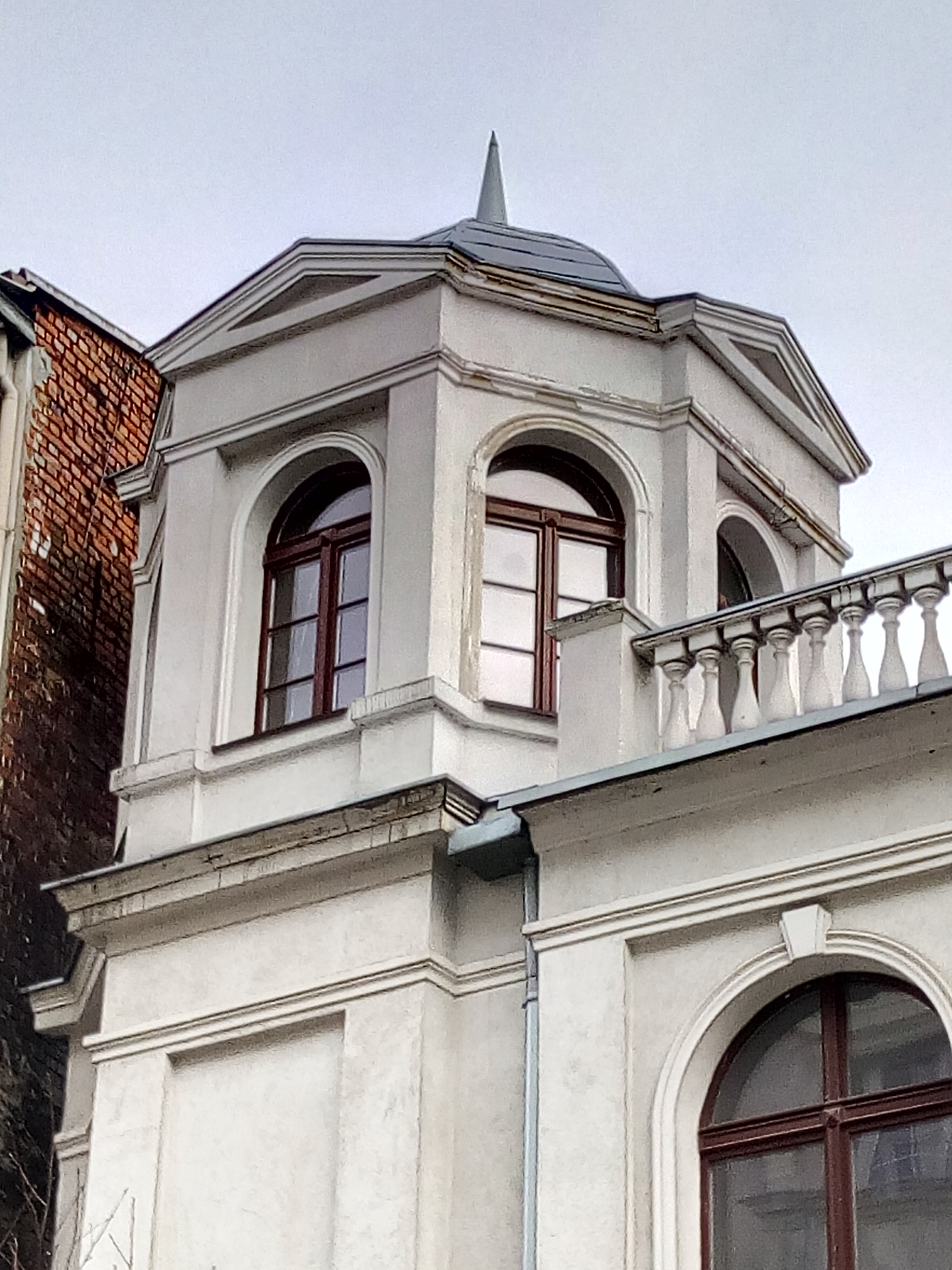
The tower and its ogee roof

=== Tenement at 39 Dworcowa Street, corner with Marcinkowskiego street ===
1890, by Józef Święcicki

Neo-Renaissance

The house at then Bahnhoffstraße 17 was commissioned by Alexander Theil, a rentier living at Gammstraße 14. The building housed on the ground floor three shops, each with a small apartment in the back and the upper floors accommodated two four-room apartments.

The corner house is remarkable by the ornamental painting between the windows of the first floor of the elevation on Dworcowa street. The edifice is massive, but the richness of its ornaments and motifs help it having a certain lightness.

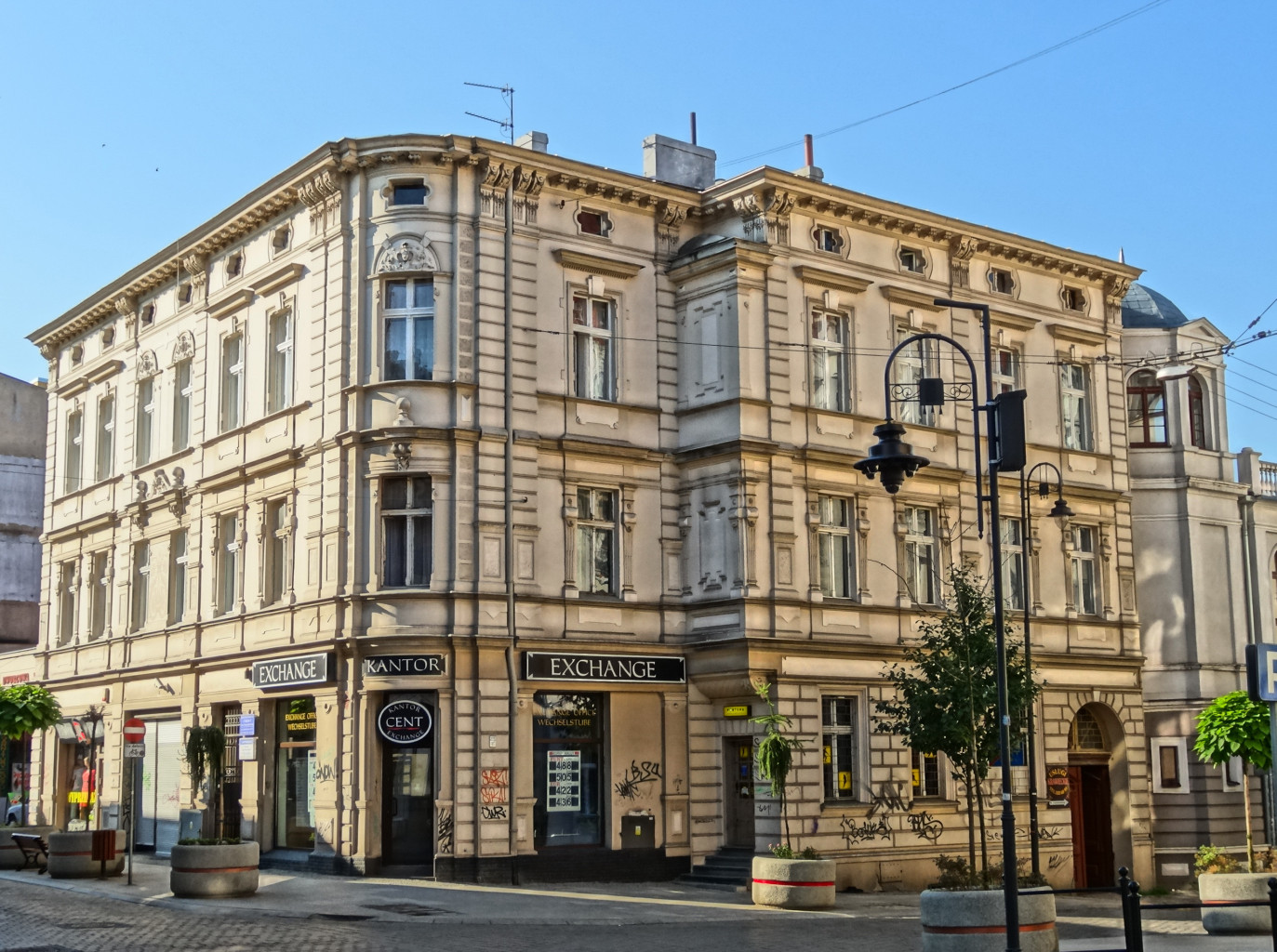
View of the tenement from the street

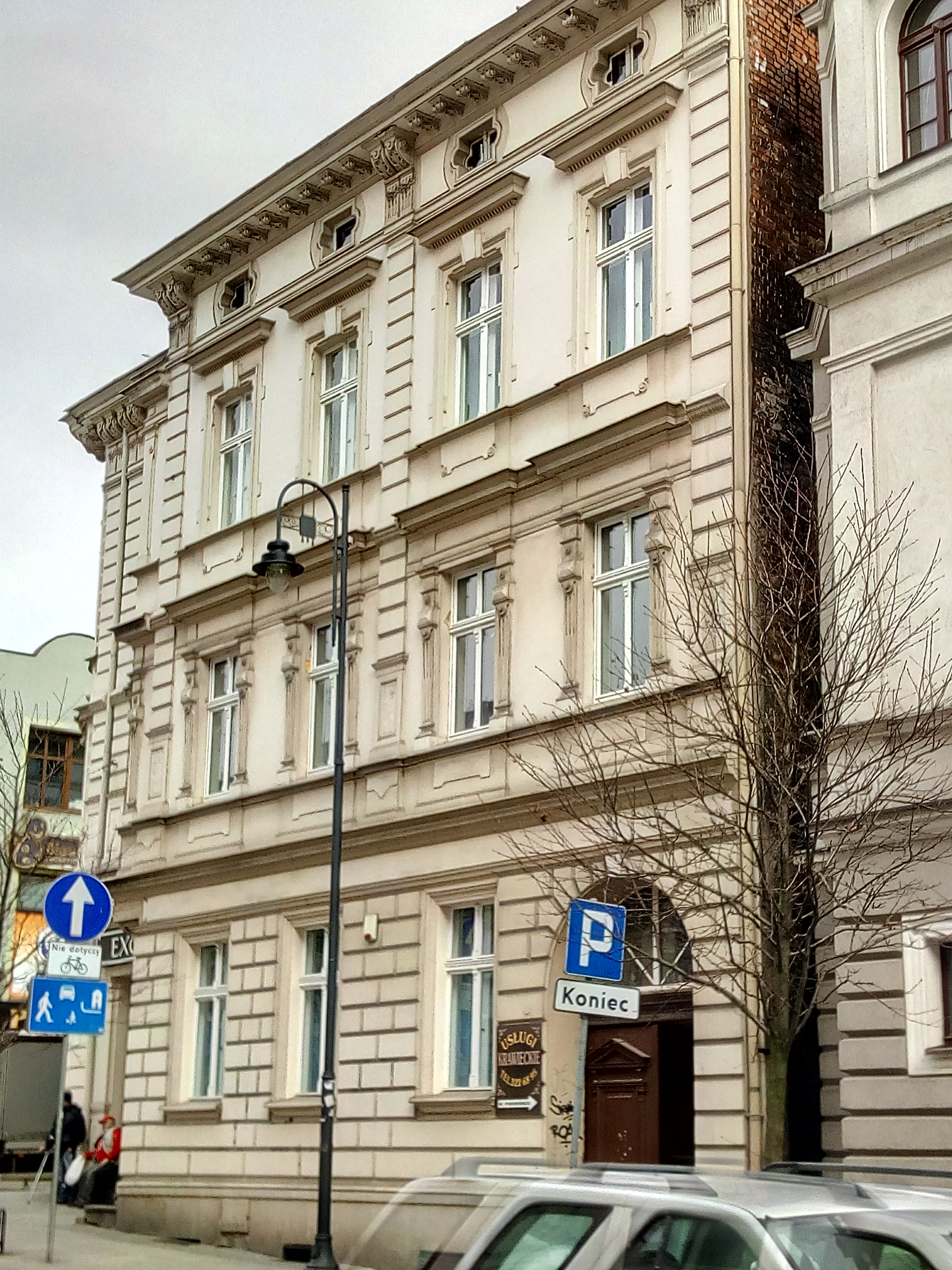
Facade onto Marcinkowskiego

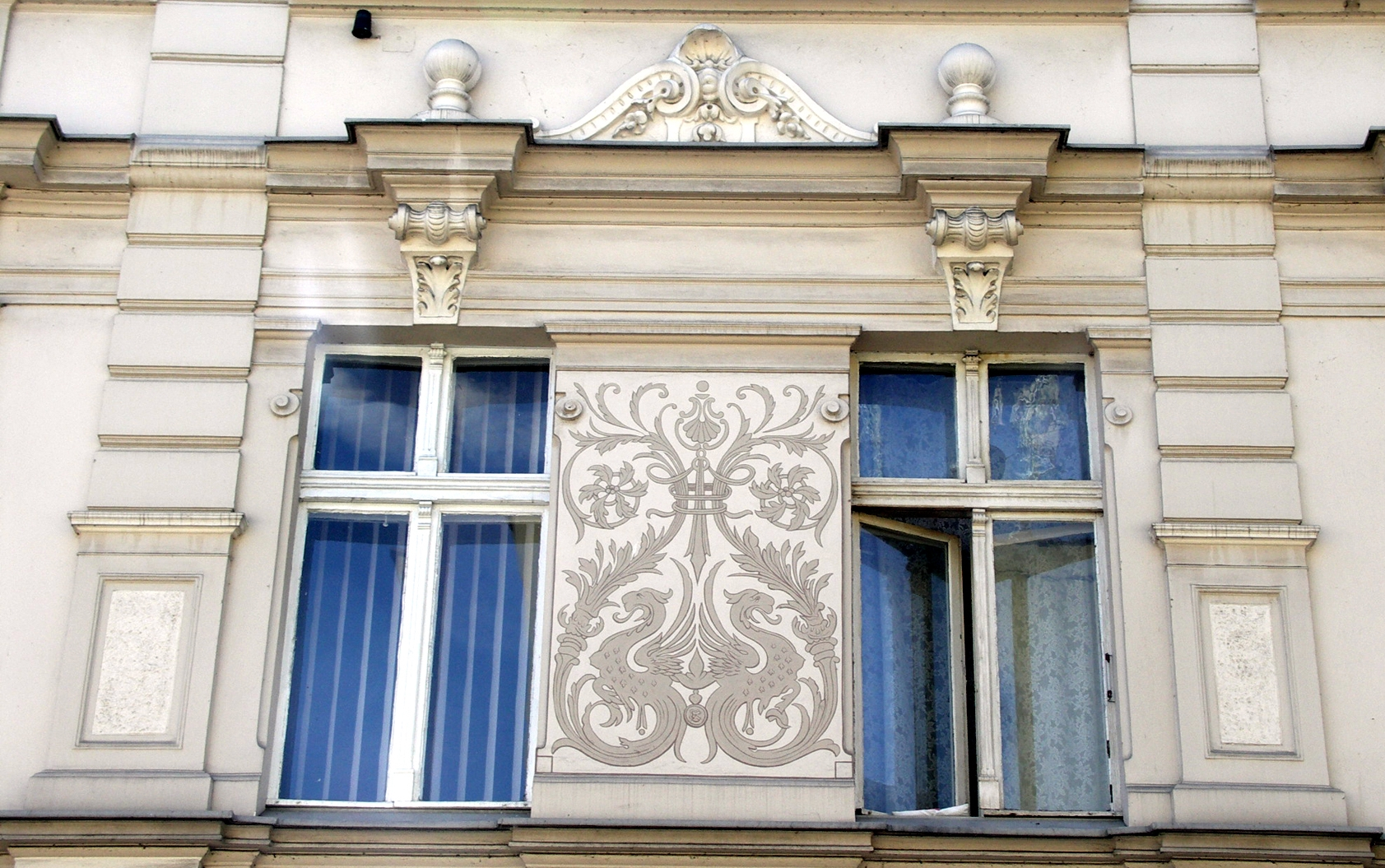
Detail of the painting on 1st florr

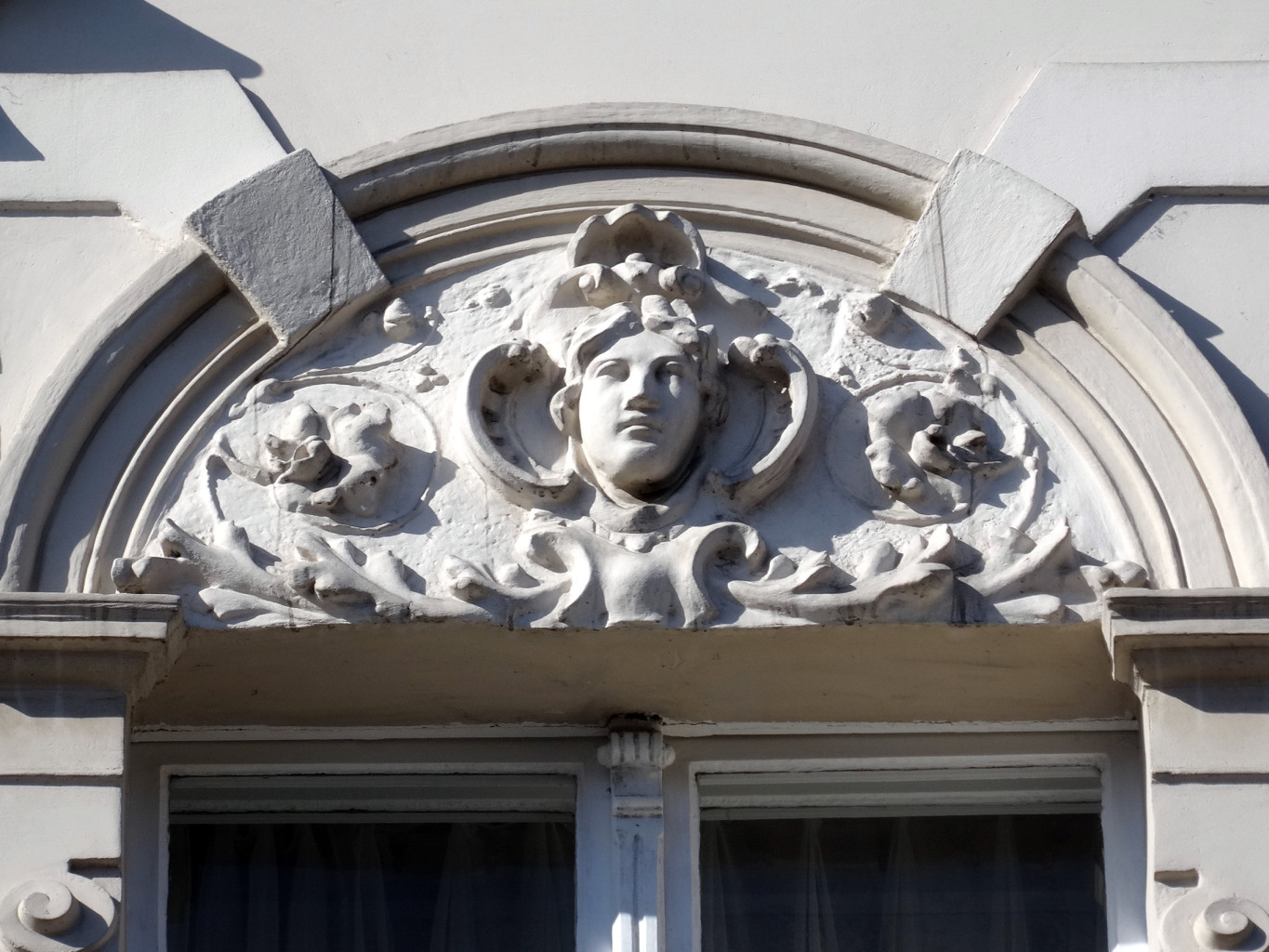
Detail of a pediment

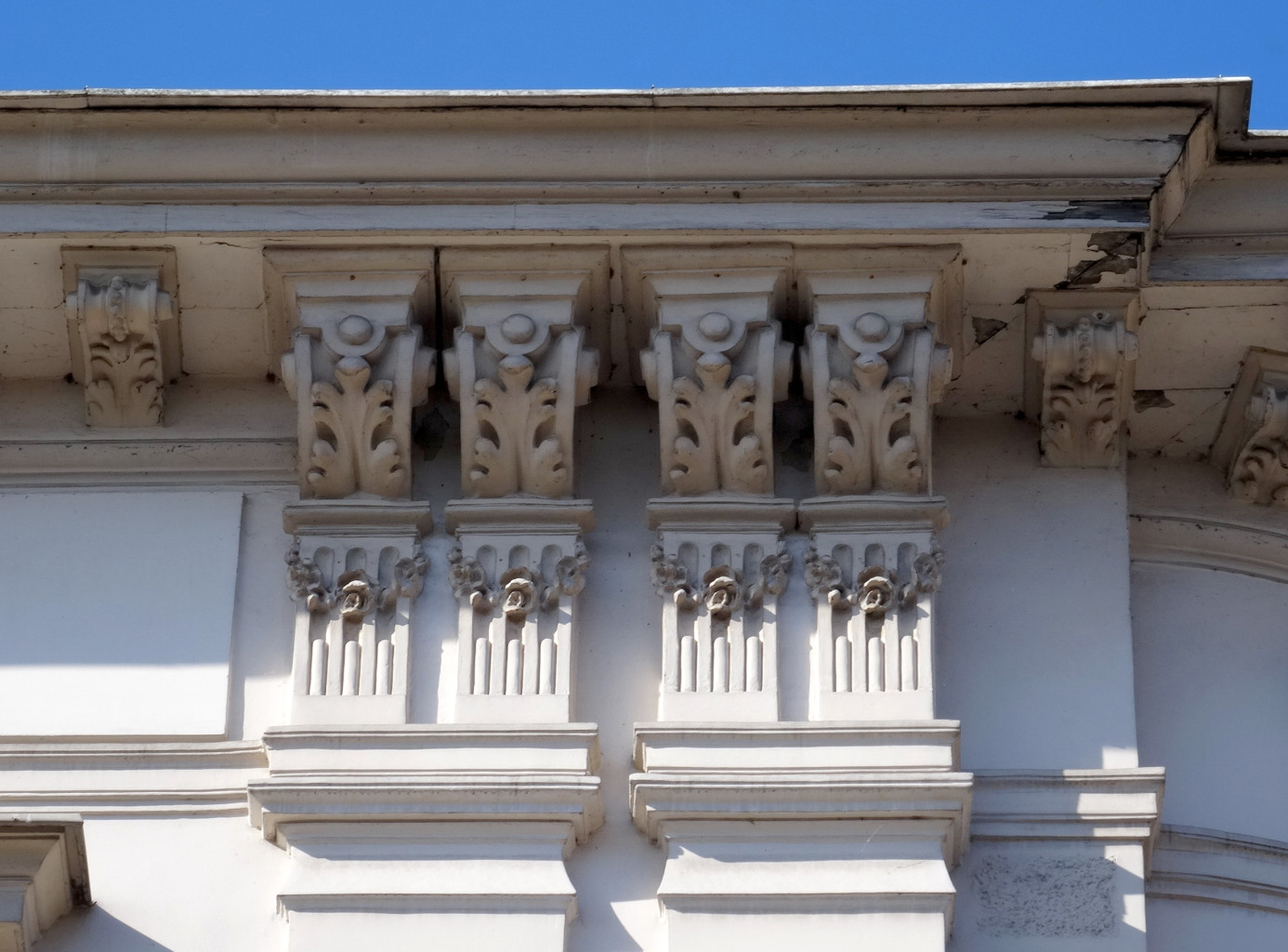
Detail of corbels

== See also ==
- Bydgoszcz
- Dworcowa Street
- Obrońców Bydgoszczy street

== Bibliography ==
- Bukolt, Alojzy (2002). W starym kinie… Kalendarz Bydgoski (in Polish). Bydgoszcz: Towarzystwo Miłośników Miasta Bydgoszczy.
- Guzek, Mariusz (2003). Bydgoskie kina oświatowe w II Rzeczypospolitej. Kronika Bydgoska XXV (in Polish). Bydgoszcz: Towarzystwo Miłośników Miasta Bydgoszczy. p. 144.
- Bukolt, Alojzy (1996). Bydgoskie kino w latach 1945-1950. Kalendarz Bydgoski (in Polish). Bydgoszcz: Towarzystwo Miłośników Miasta Bydgoszczy. p. 118.
- Janiszewska-Mincer, Barbara (1982). Z tradycji kin bydgoskich. Kalendarz Bydgoski (in Polish). Bydgoszcz: Towarzystwo Miłośników Miasta Bydgoszczy. p. 97.
