= Obrońców Bydgoszczy Street, Bydgoszcz =

Street in Bydgoszcz, Poland

Coordinates: 53°07′36″N 17°59′55″E

Obrońców Bydgoszczy Street
Bydgoszcz
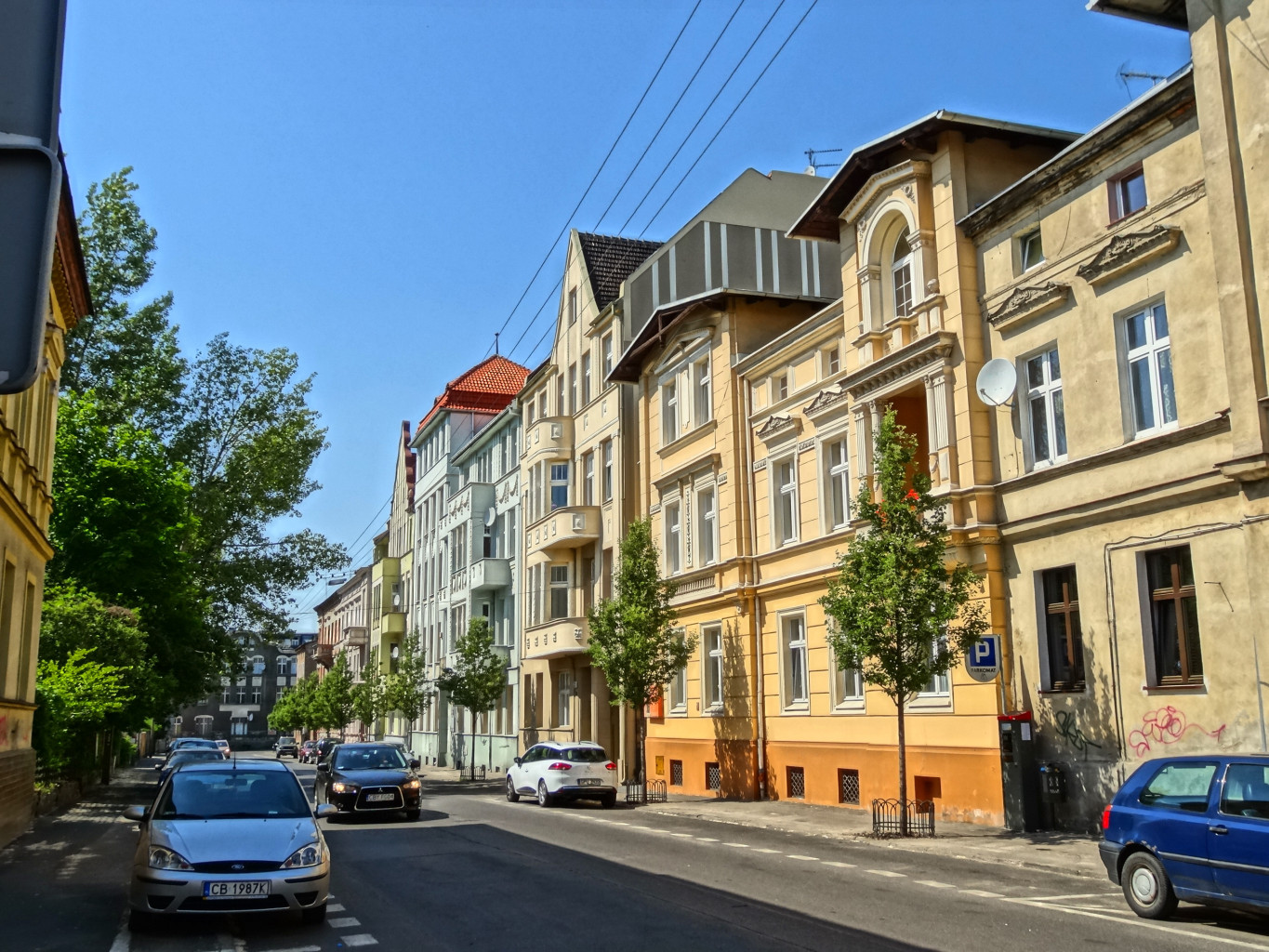
- View of street facades

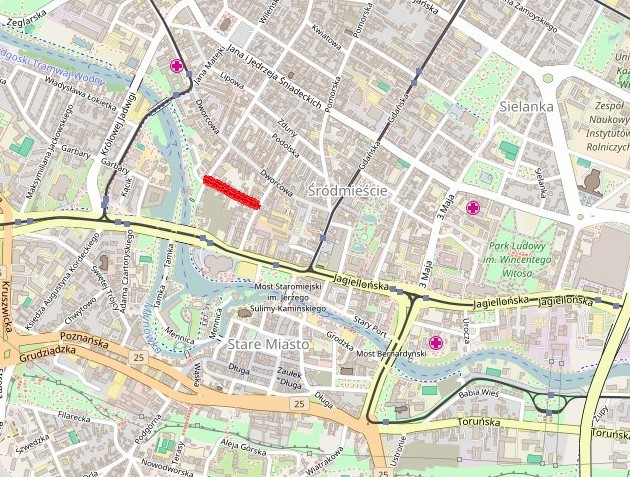
- Obrońców Bydgoszczy street on a Bydgoszcz map
- Native name: Ulica Obrońców Bydgoszczy (Polish)
- Former names: Peterson Straße, Ulica Trzeciego Września
- Namesake: The defenders of Bydgoszcz
- Owner: City of Bydgoszcz
- Length: 200 m (660 ft)Google maps
- Width: ca. 10m
- Area: Downtown district
- Location: Bydgoszcz, Poland

Construction
- Construction start: 1884
- Completed: End of 1880s

Obrońców Bydgoszczy street is located in downtown district, in Bydgoszcz, Poland. Many of the buildings along this axis are either registered on the Kuyavian-Pomeranian Voivodeship heritage list, or part of a historical ensemble of Eclectic and Art Nouveau architecture in the city.

== Location ==
Located in downtown district, the street unfolds on an approximate south east - north west axis, parallel to Dworcowa Street, from Warmińskiego street on the east to Marcinkowskiego street on its western tip.

== History ==
The first map of the city that references the street was issued at the outbreak of First World War: the path appears under the name Petersonstraße.

Nevertheless, the 1884 issue of Bromberg's Adressbuch mentions the street, albeit with only two registered names

=== Naming ===
The pathway, initially known as Petersonstraße, has kept this naming after the re-creation of the Polish state in 1920, as Ulica Petersona. Ernst Emil Peterson (1808–1867) and his son Julius (1852–1935) have both been mayor of Bromberg.

Even during German occupation (1939–1945), the axis preserved this calling.

At the end of WWII, the street name changed to Ulica Trzeciego Września (Street of the 3rd of September), in reference to Bydgoszcz's Bloody Sunday events of 1939.

The current namesake, Obrońców Bydgoszczy (transl. Defenders of Bydgoszcz), commemorates all the heroes who defended the city during the Second World War.

== Main edifices ==
Tenement house at 1, corner with Emila Warmińskiego Street

1884-1885

Eclecticism

The building has been one of the first erected in the street under Prussian rule, initially to house a private high school for girls (German: Höhere Töchterschule), then registered at 9 Gammstraße. In the 1910s, the school received the namesake of (Margarete) Dreger, one of its headmistress and was later called Dregersche Schule. After the re-creation of the Polish state, the private high school kept working, for girls and boys, under the same appellation: Priwatne Liceum im. Drögera. After the Second World War, the edifice lodged municipal Psychological and Pedagogical establishment Nr.1 (Polish: Poradnia Psychologiczno-Pedagogiczna). The institution moved out in the 2010s, and the ensemble has been proposed for selling to private owners by the city authorities in 2017. The intent is to set up here various activities including a Social Services Center and a nursery.

The edifice comprises three buildings displaying various styles, the lowest one being the former school gymnasium. The tenement standing at street corner has the most elaborated facades, with eclectic features: sleek bossage on the ground floor, windows topped by heavy lintels on the first floor and triangular pediments on the second, belt courses separating each level and a simple corbel table crowning the elevation.

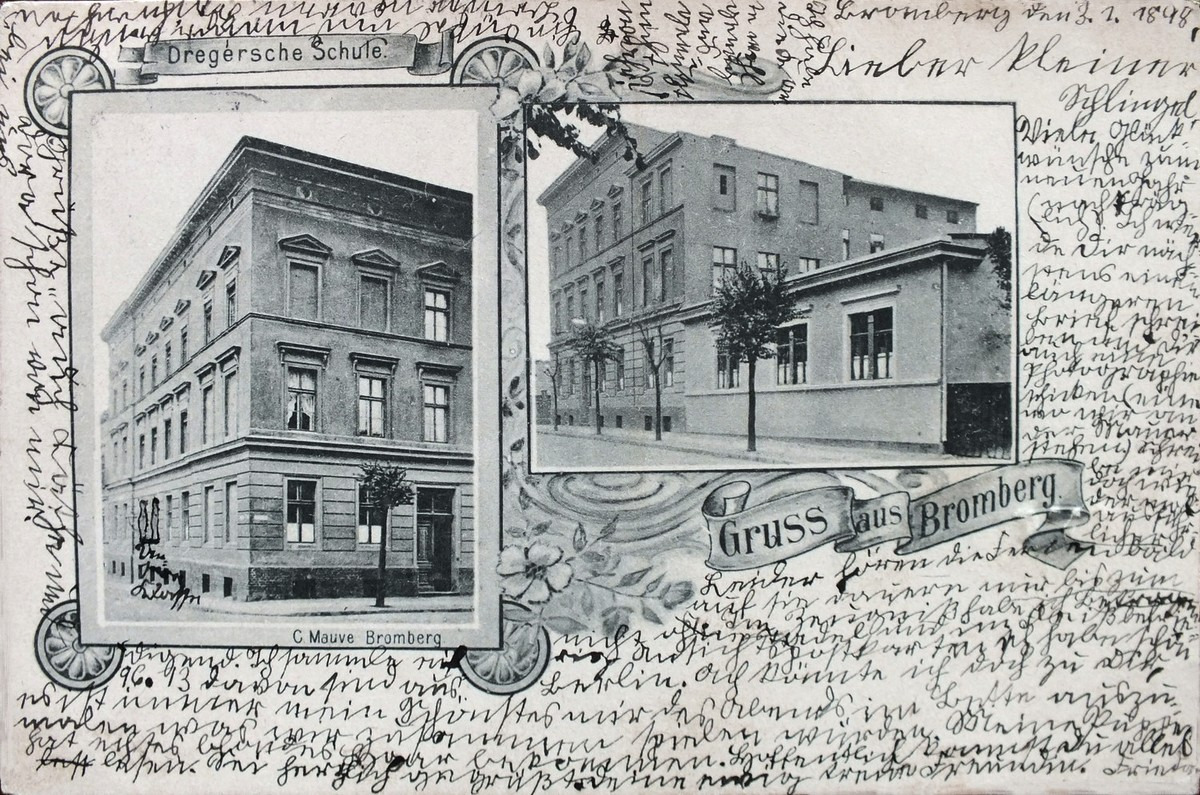
Postcard picture of the school ca 1898

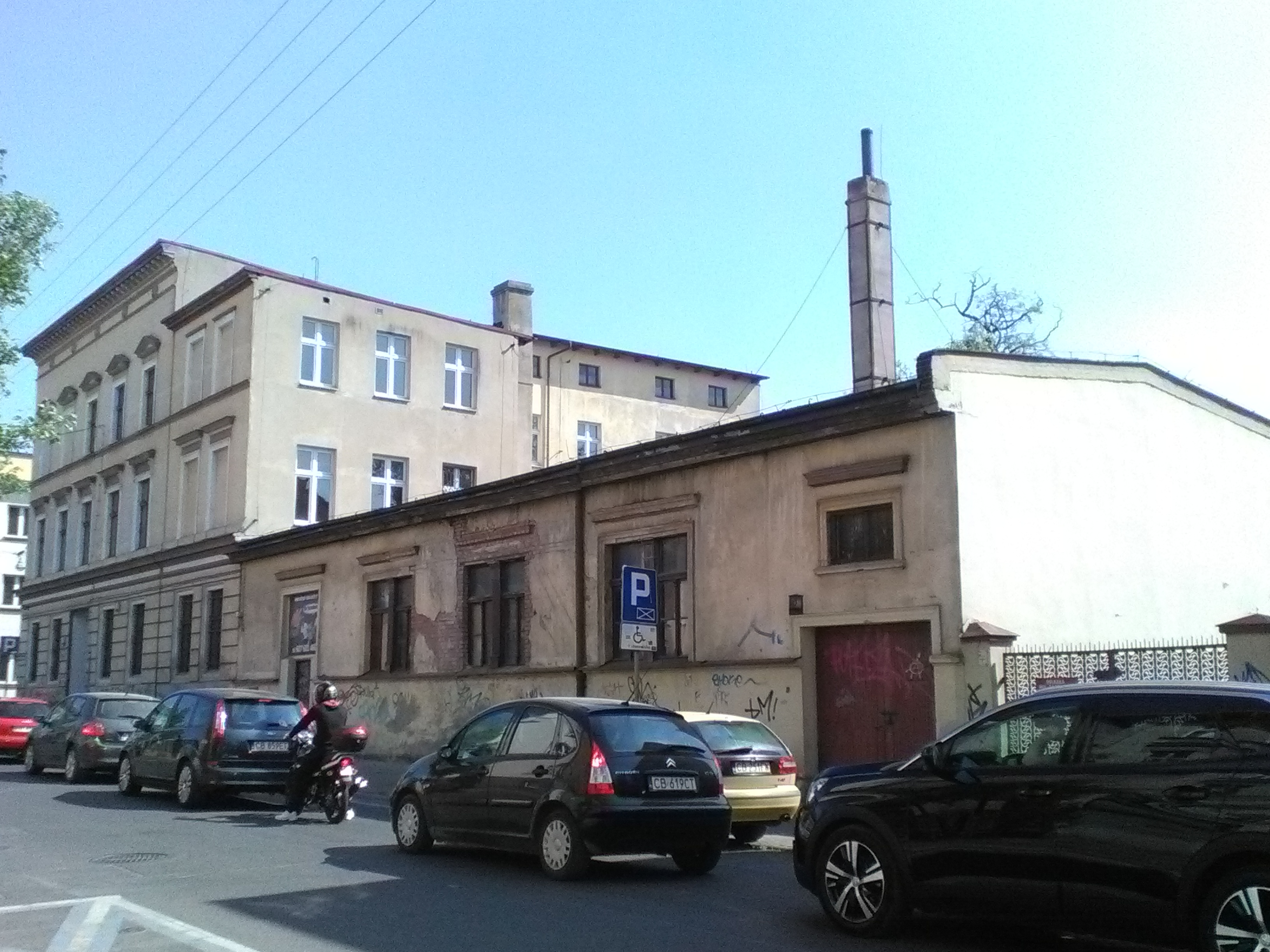
Frontages on the street, with the former gymnasium on the far right

Music Academy building, corner with 13 Emila Warmińskiego street

1905

Eclecticism

Initially a German private high school for boys located at Gammstraße 8, the building now houses the Department of Conducting, Jazz and Music Education of Bydgoszcz Music Academy - "Feliks Nowowiejski".

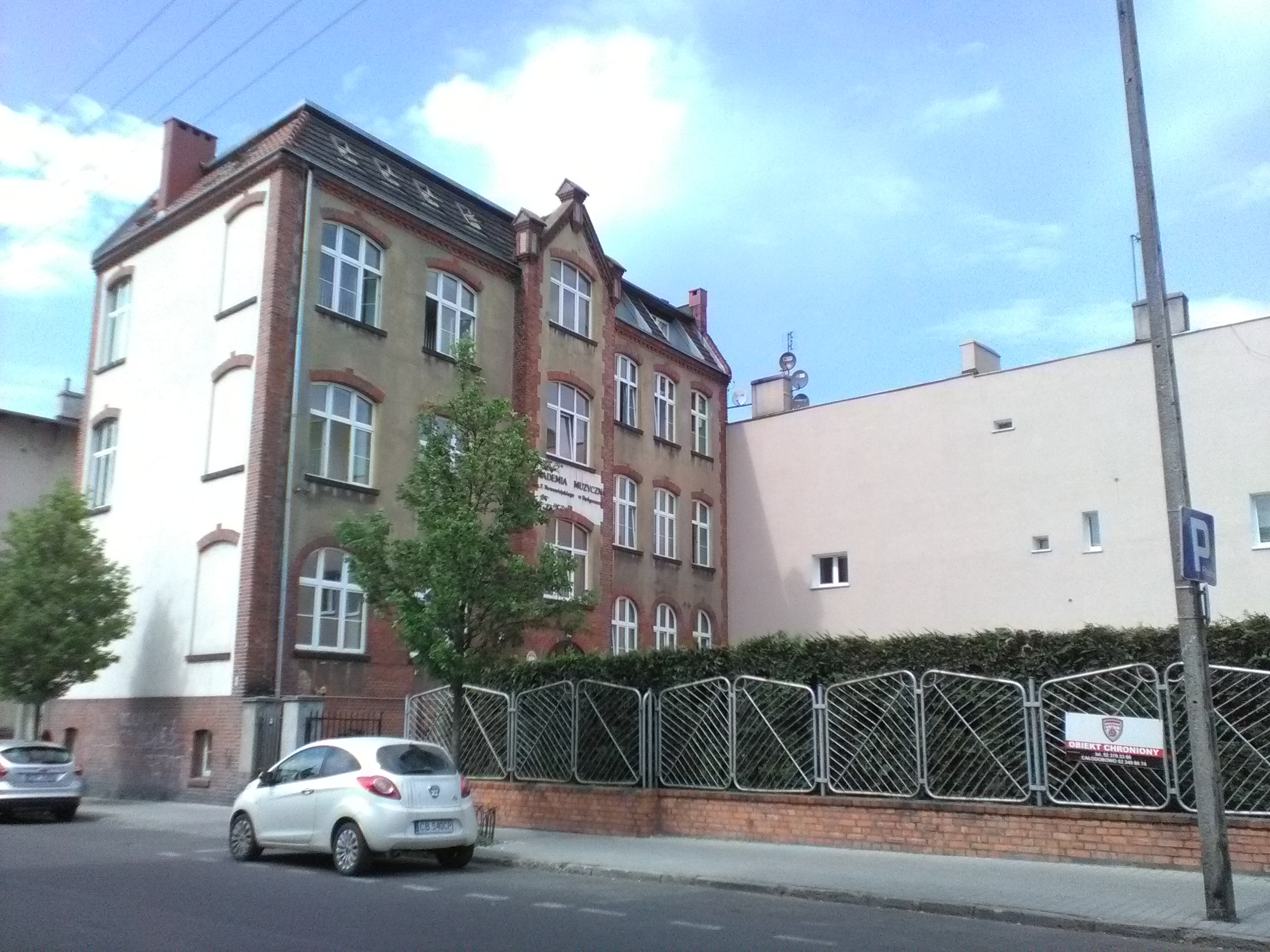
View from Obrońców Bydgoszczy street

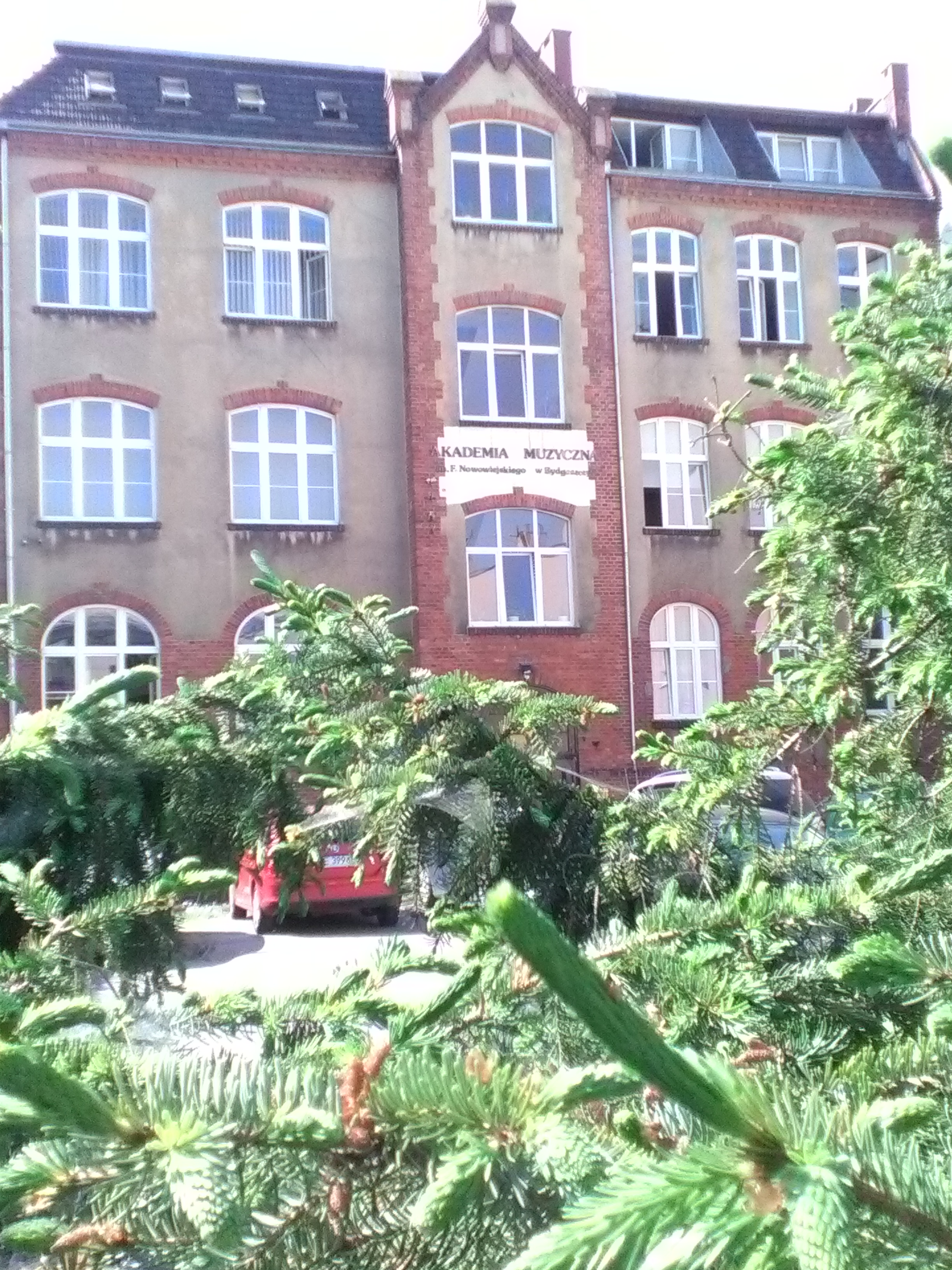
View of the main frontage from Emila Warmińskiego street

Julius Holtz tenement at 2/4

Registered on Kuyavian-Pomeranian Voivodeship heritage list, Nr.601387 A/850 (April 9, 1996)

1883-1884

Eclecticism

The plot covering Nr.2 and 4 belonged in the early 1880s to Julius Holtz. As a merchant, he had these buildings constructed in 1884 and lived at Nr.2, then Petersonstraße 15[6]. Later he became a business bank manager and kept ownership of the premises till the outbreak of WWI. In the 1920s, the ensemble was divided into two tenements and was the property of various merchants.

Both houses show symmetrical shapes, based on a vertical axis cutting through the middle bay window, reminiscent of the original aim of the construction as one tenement. Eclectic style is apparent, in particular with balustrades, cartouches filled with motifs, friezes, figure head inside pediments and three characteristic open gables. The middle body displays a large bay window carrying a loggia flanked with columns and pilasters, capped on the upper floor by a round French window decorated with a myriad of elements.

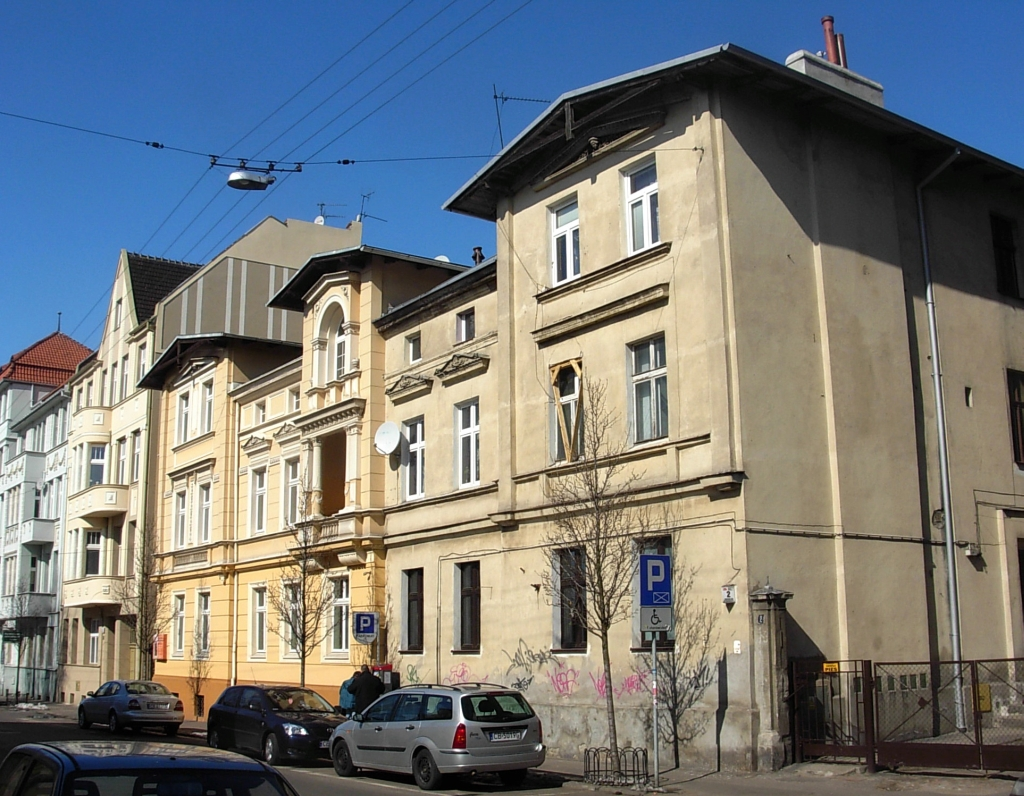
View from the street

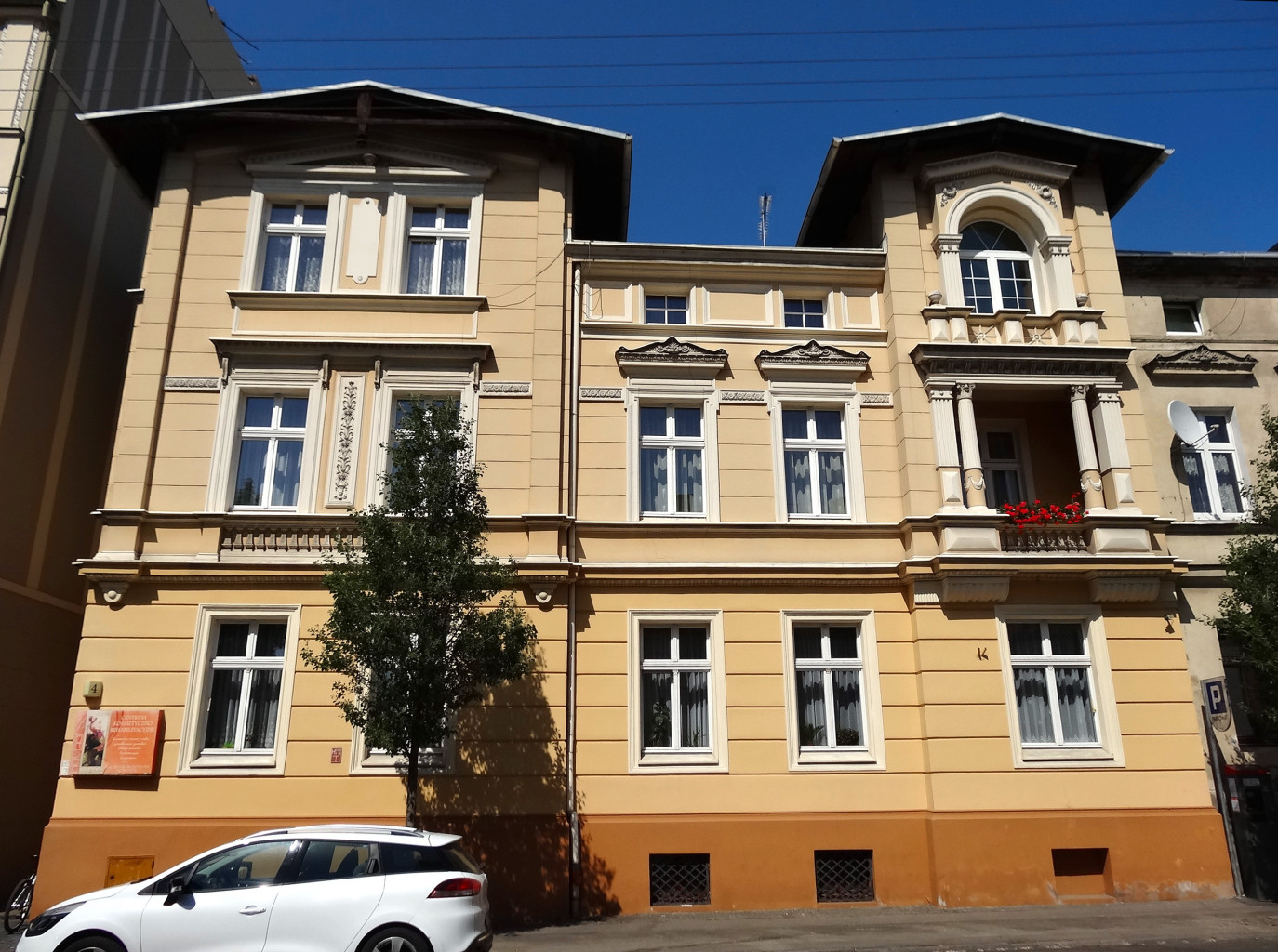
Recently renovated Nr.4

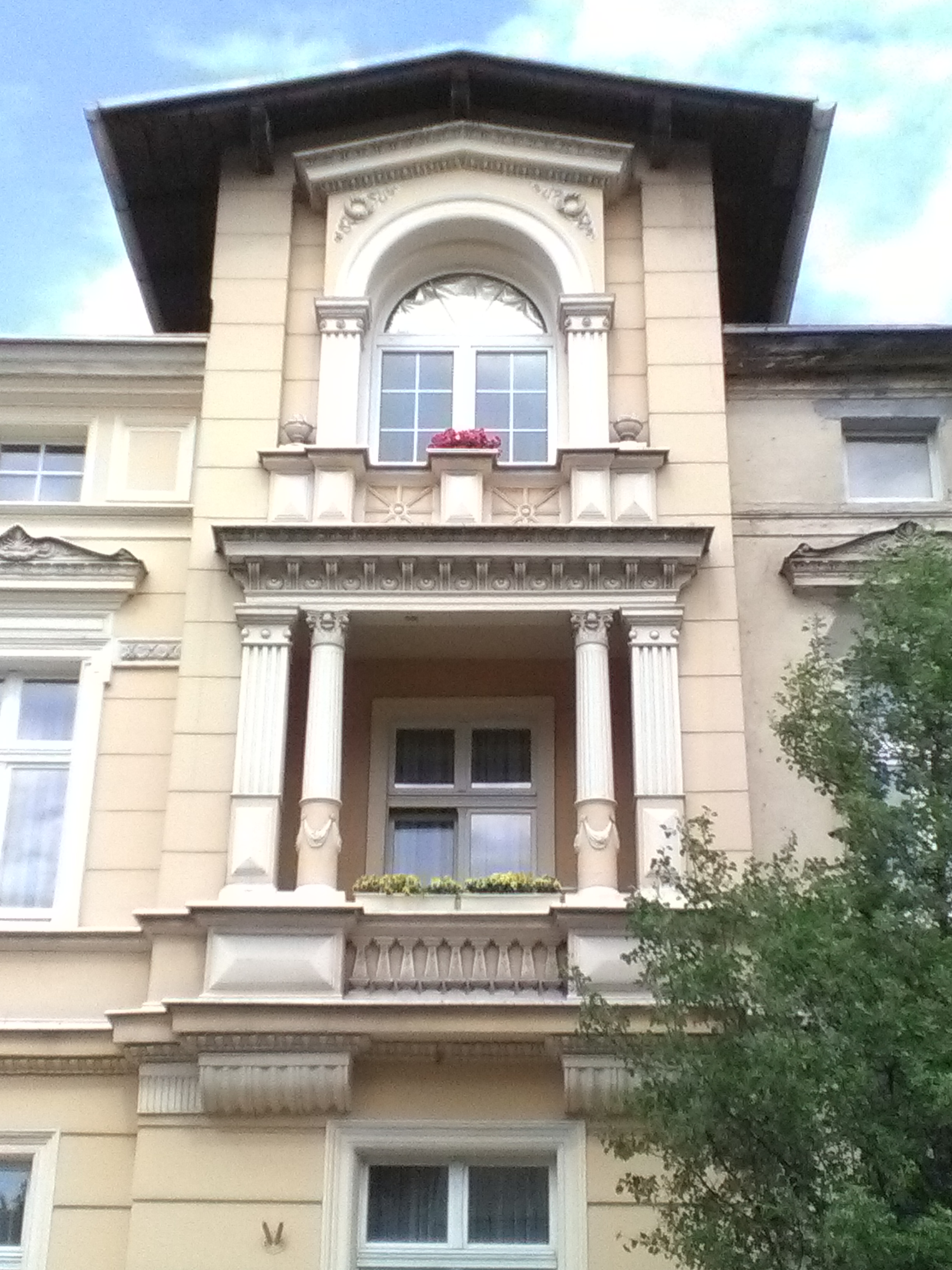
Details of the adorned bay window

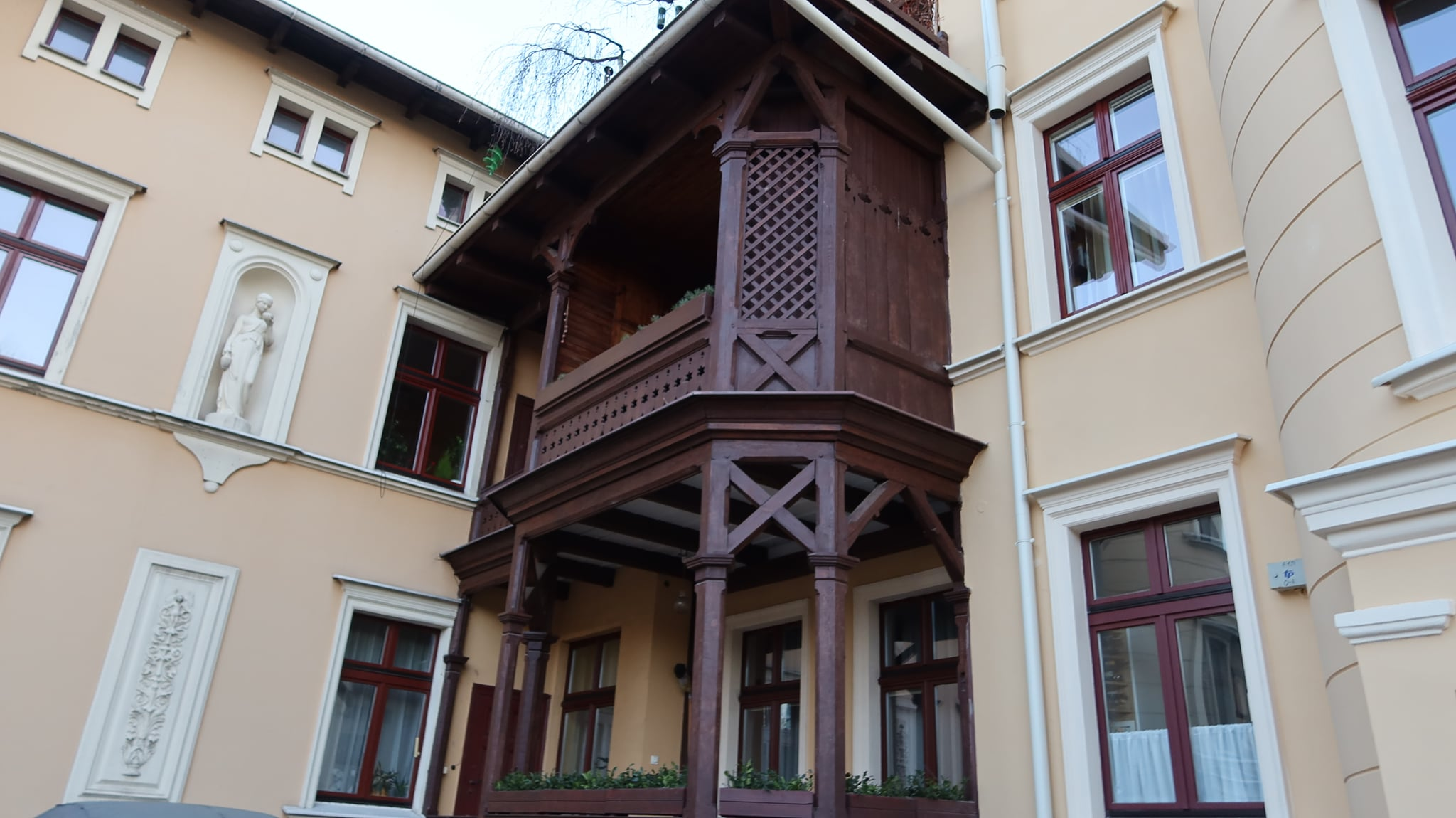
Renovated Backyard

House at 3

1883

Eclecticism

The building has been one of the first erected in the street in Prussian times, along with Nr.1. Its first registered landlord was August Remus, an audit inspector in 1885. A few years later, the property became a full board house run by Hedwig Kretschmer during a decade. In 1908, the Congregation of the Sisters of Saint Elizabeth, coming from Wrocław, took possession of the house. The first sisters moved in on December 13, 1921, invited by father Jan Konopczyński. There, they took care of patients and organized kindergarten activities till the start of WWII. After a break under Communist regime, the congregation re-opened a new facility in September 1991, at Stanisława Leszczyńskiego street 40.

The squat house shows eclectic details on its facade, especially around the upper floor openings: adorned pediments topped with strip of friezes and a table corbel.

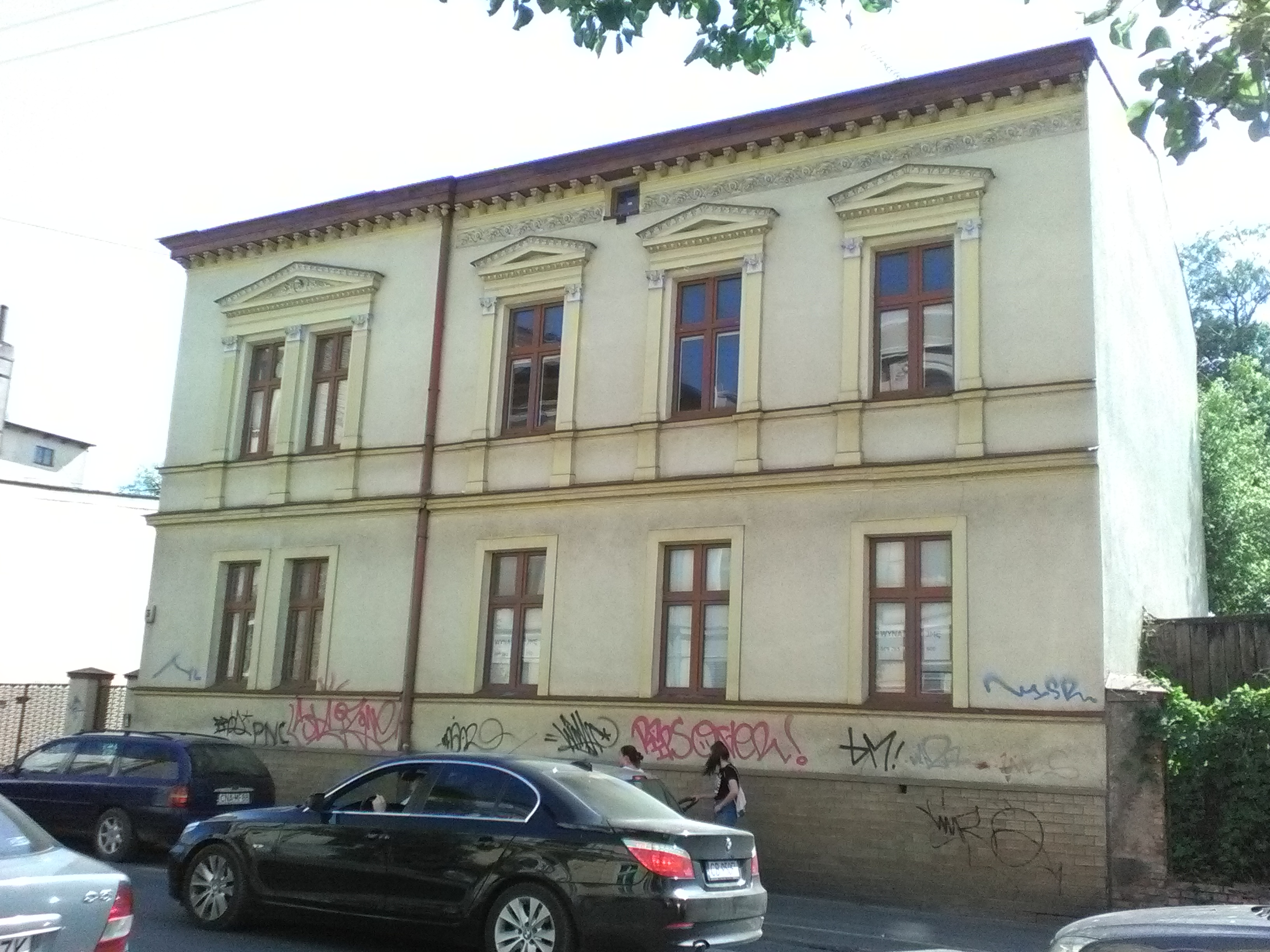
Frontage from the street

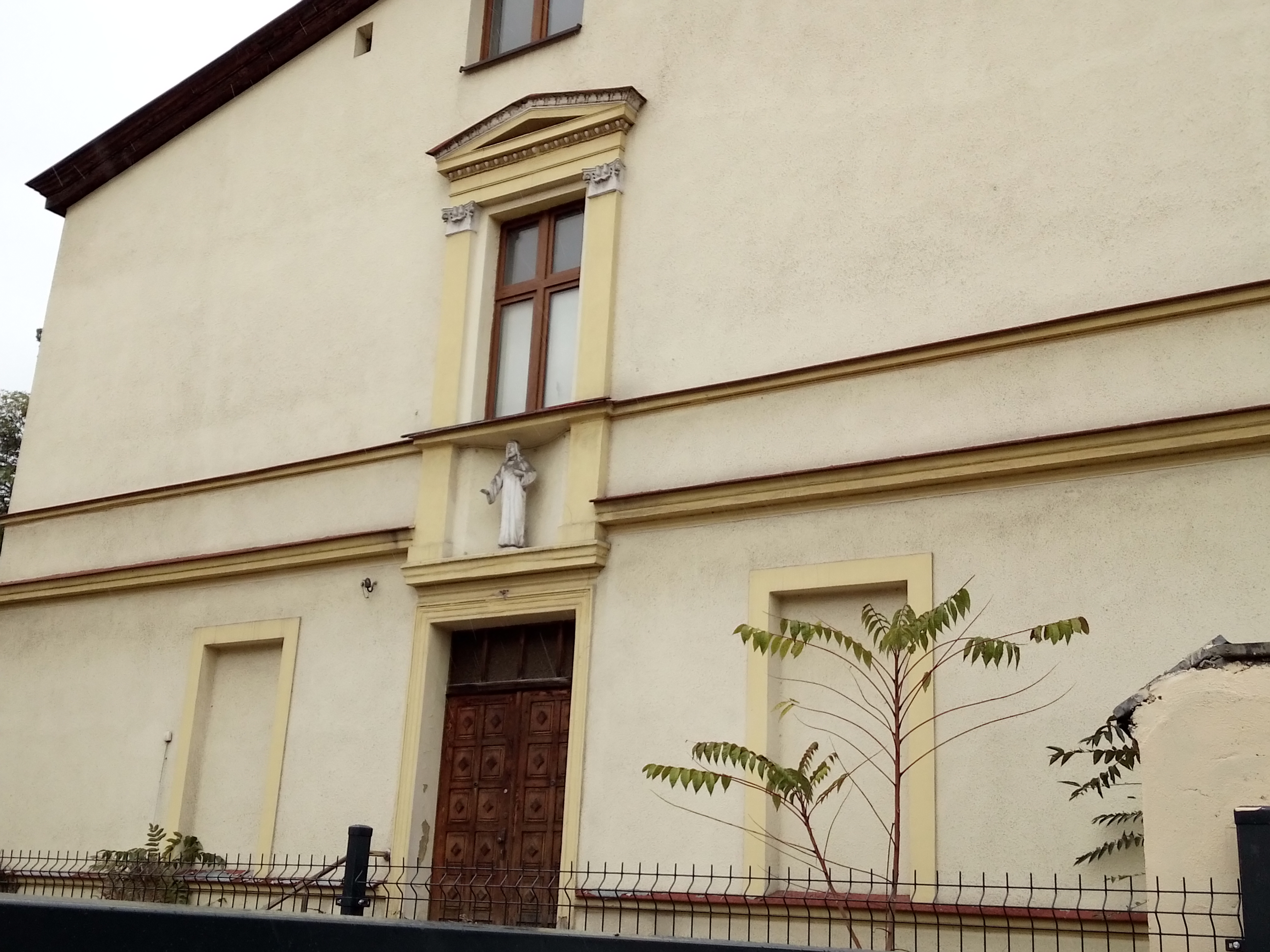
Side facade

Friedrich Härzer tenement at 6

Registered on Kuyavian-Pomeranian Voivodeship heritage list, Nr.718272 A/1362 (May 15, 2008)

1912, by Albert Schleusener

Art Nouveau and Early modernism

The building has been commissioned by Friedrich Härzer, a clothing merchant at Danzigerstraße 45 (today's 77 Gdańska Street).

The edifice's frontage is scattered with cartouches with geometric forms, those on the balcony of the first floor depict mustached faces. The superposition of balconies and bay windows, with their curved shapes and their adorned sleek columns, which are duplicated even at door's level, recalls the Art Nouveau style. However, the rest of the facade does not show a plethora of motifs, as it is usual in Art Nouveau buildings. This absence combined with the feeling of verticality imposed by slender pilasters, narrow openings or the single steep gable reminds of the prelude of the modernism movement.

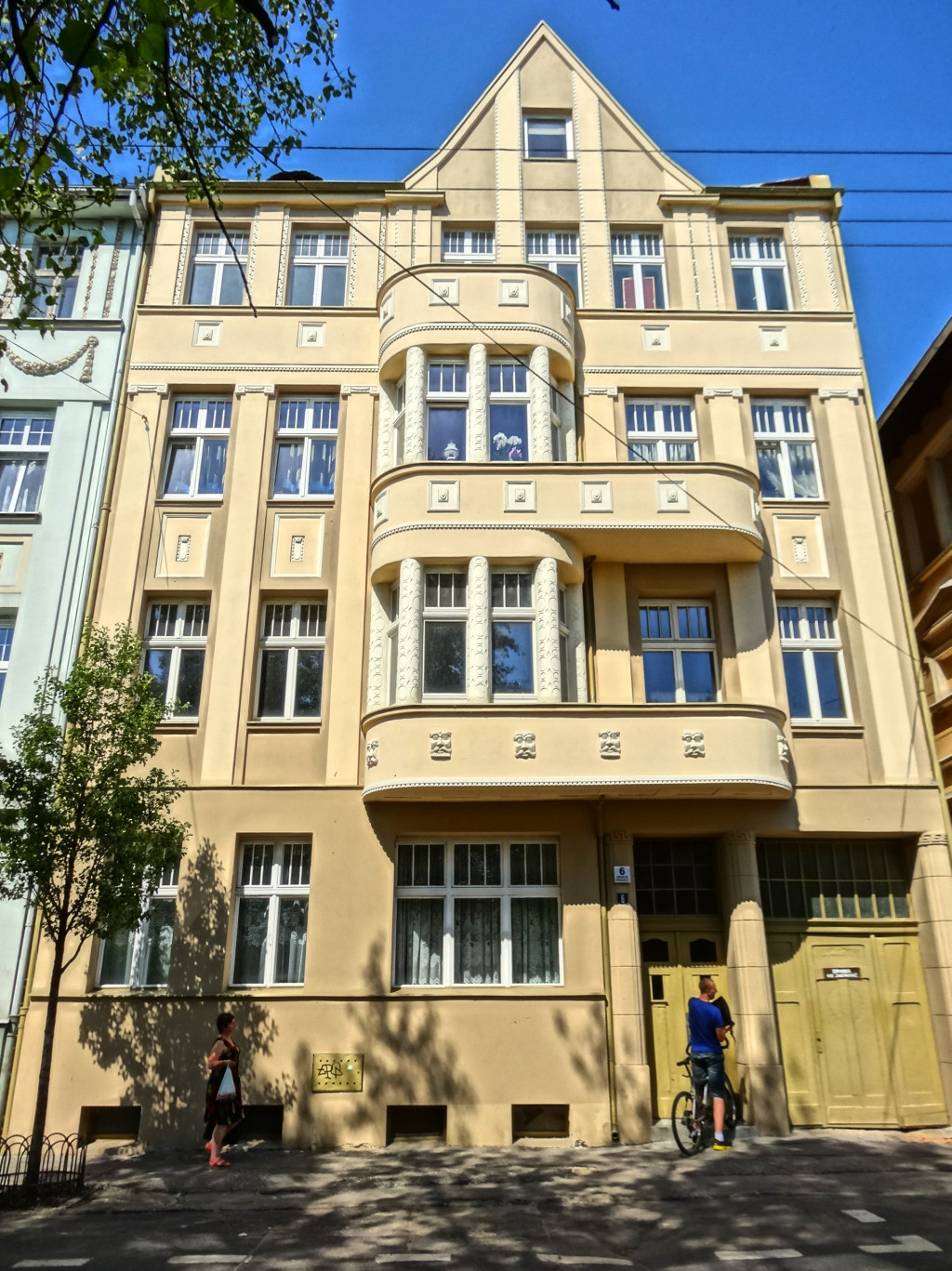
Main elevation from the street

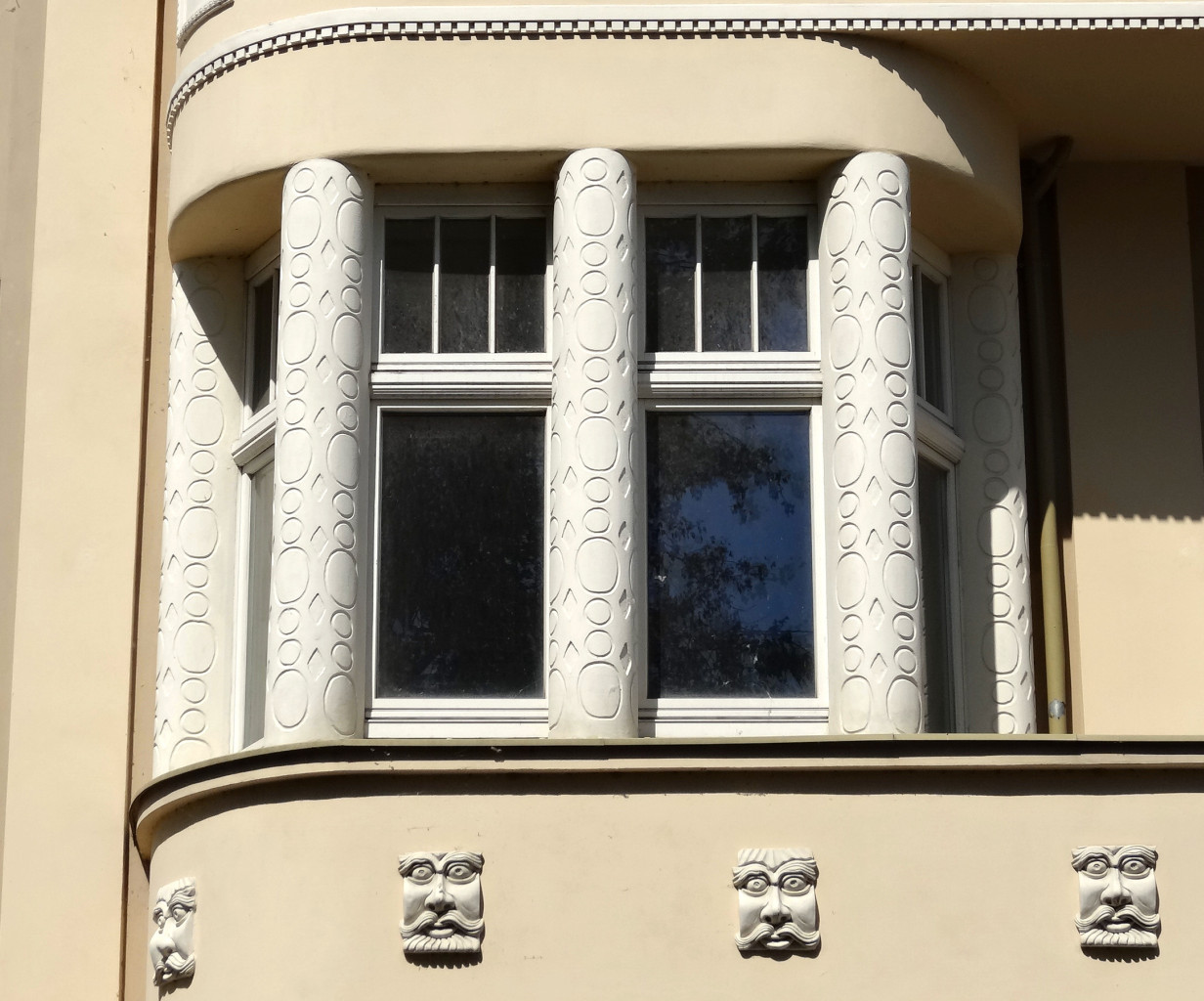
Decoration details

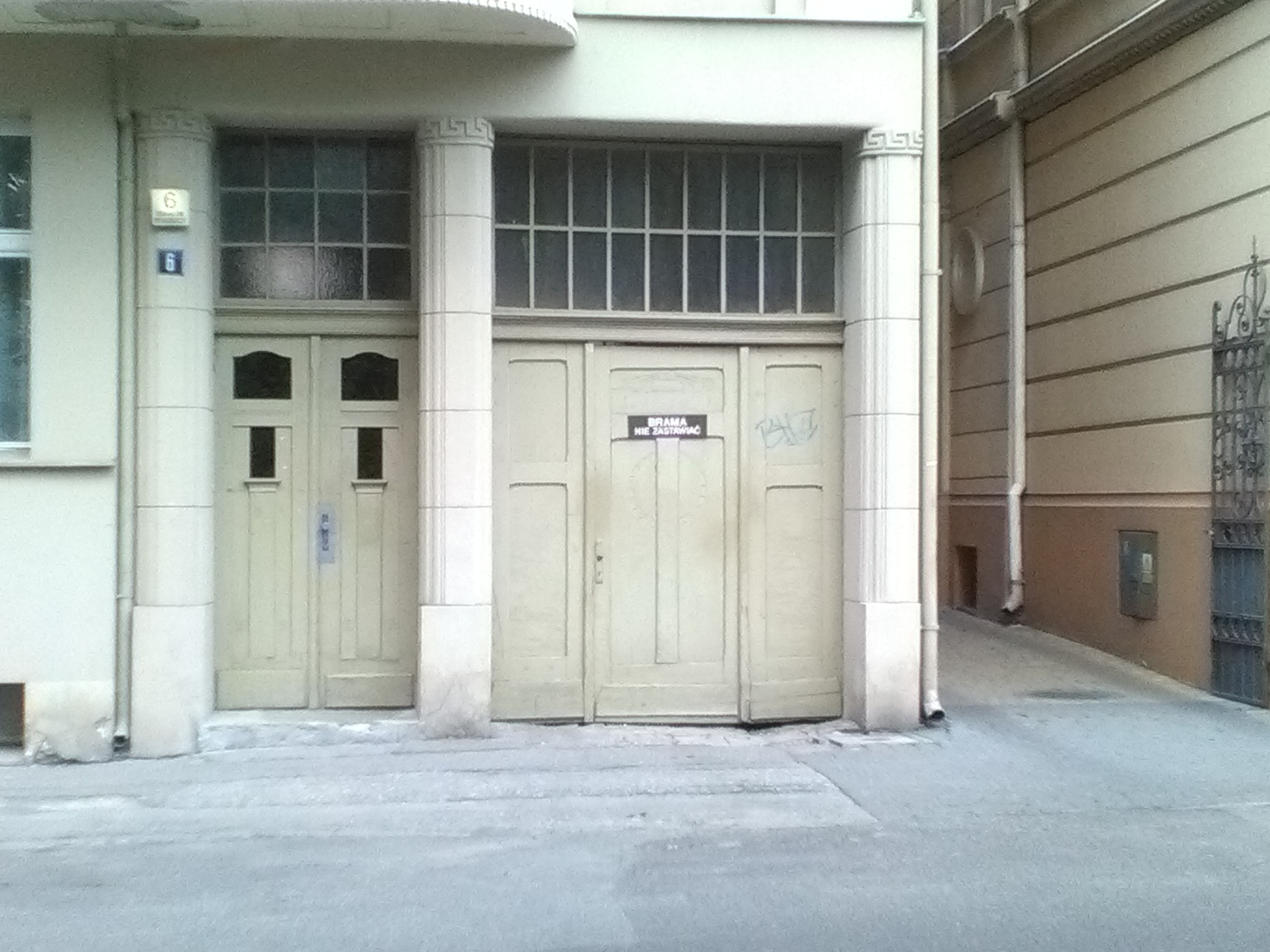
Adorned entrance doors

Tenement house at 8

1912, by Albert Schleusener

Art Nouveau and Early modernism

The building at then Petersonstraße 12a, has been commissioned by Friedrich Härzer, the clothing merchant who owned also Nr.6.

The frontage is massive, cut into geometric shapes (bay-windows, balconies, openings), prompting reference to early modernism features, while the decoration (festoons, large cartouches, mustached faces, thin friezes and eyelid dormers) clings to Art Nouveau canons.

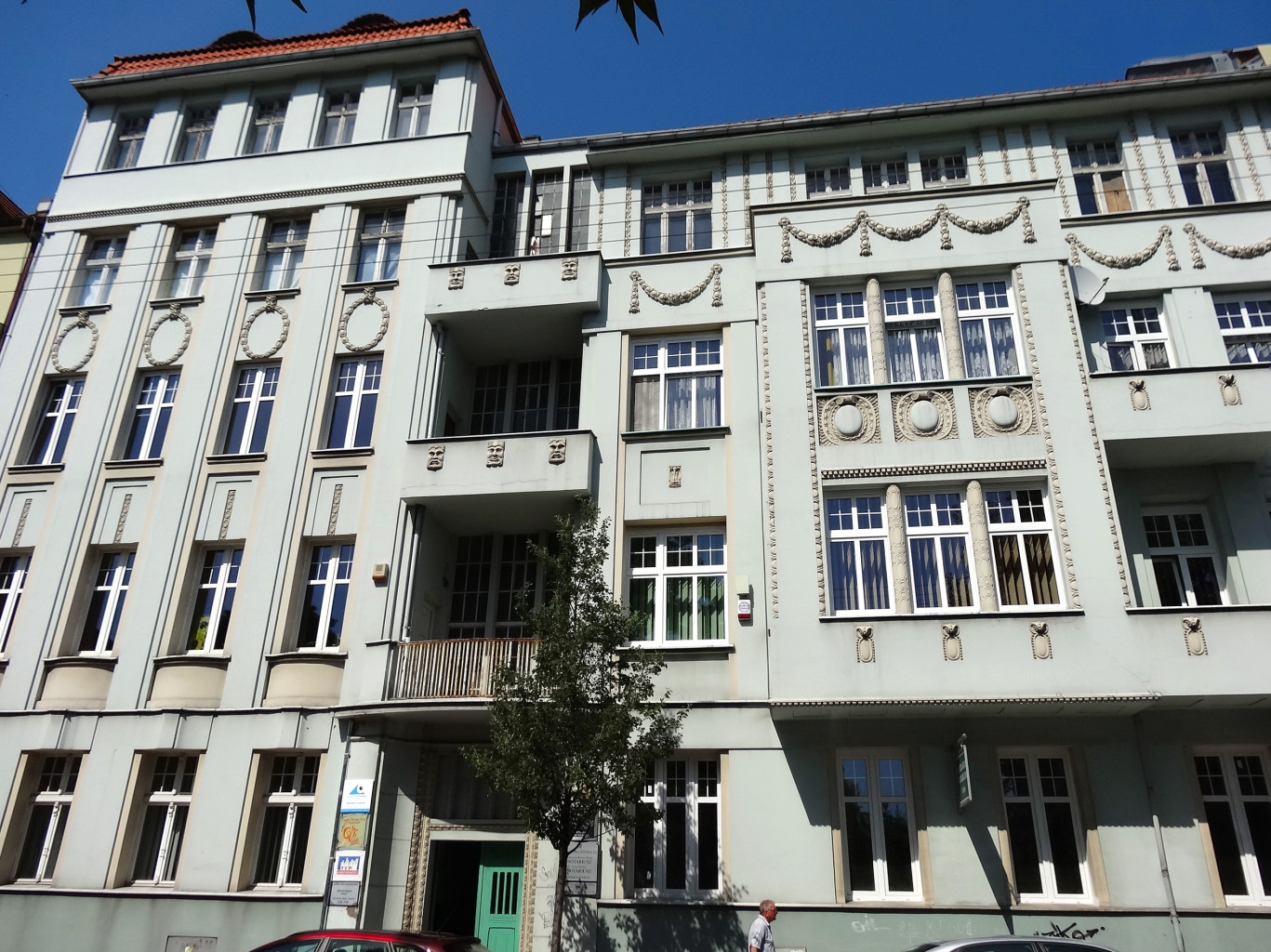
Main elevation

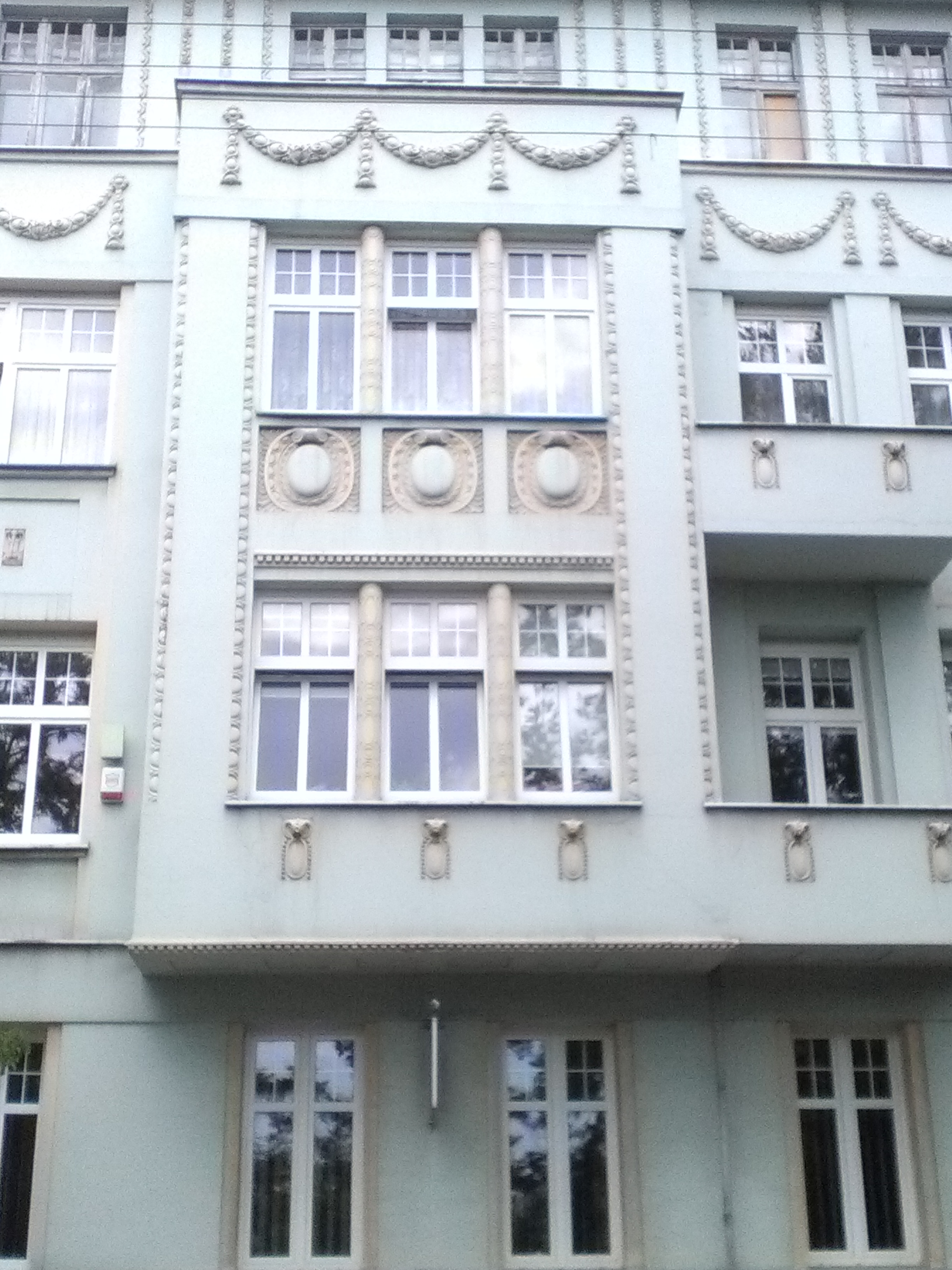
Bay-window decoration

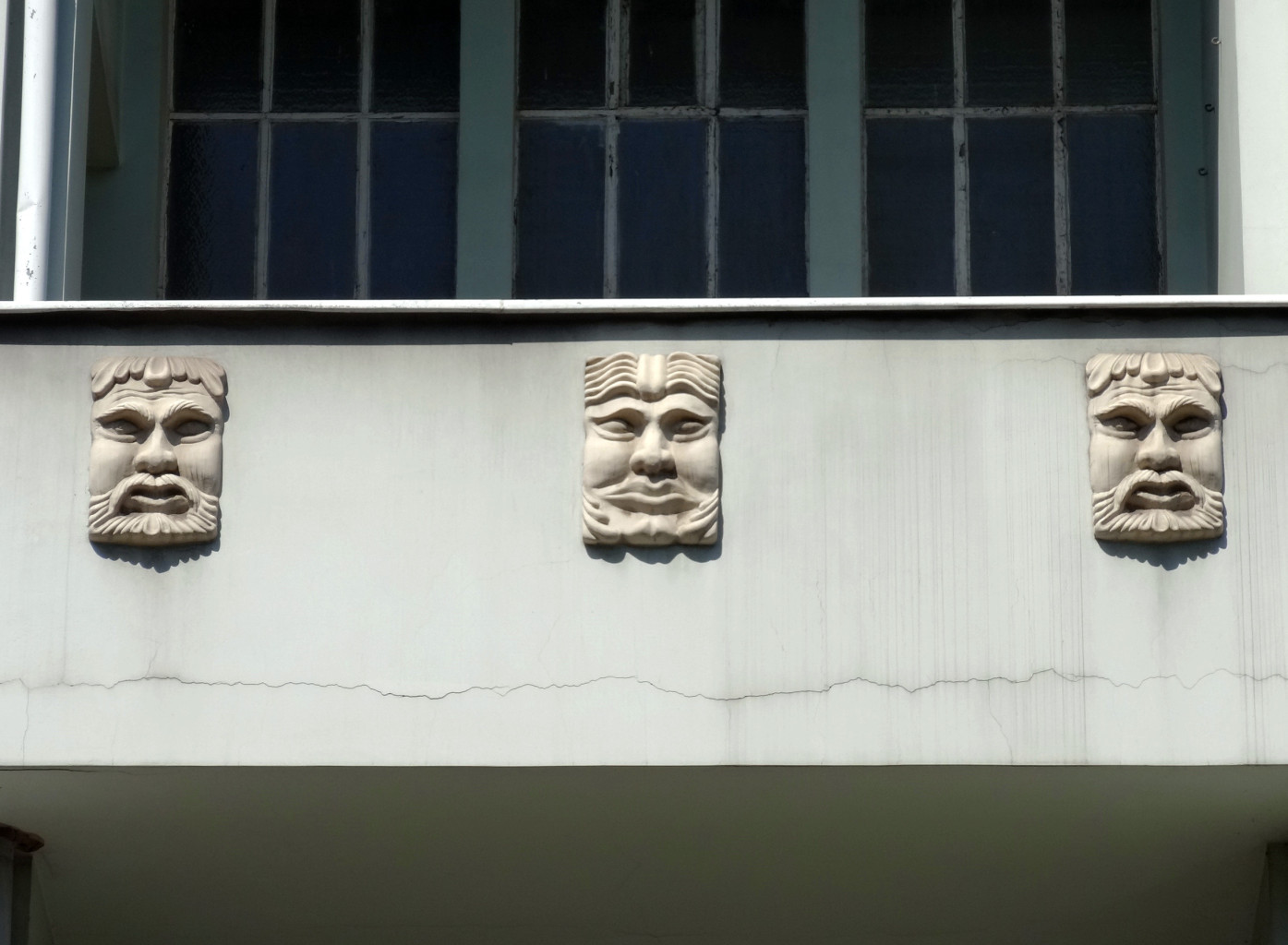
Mustached faces on the balcony

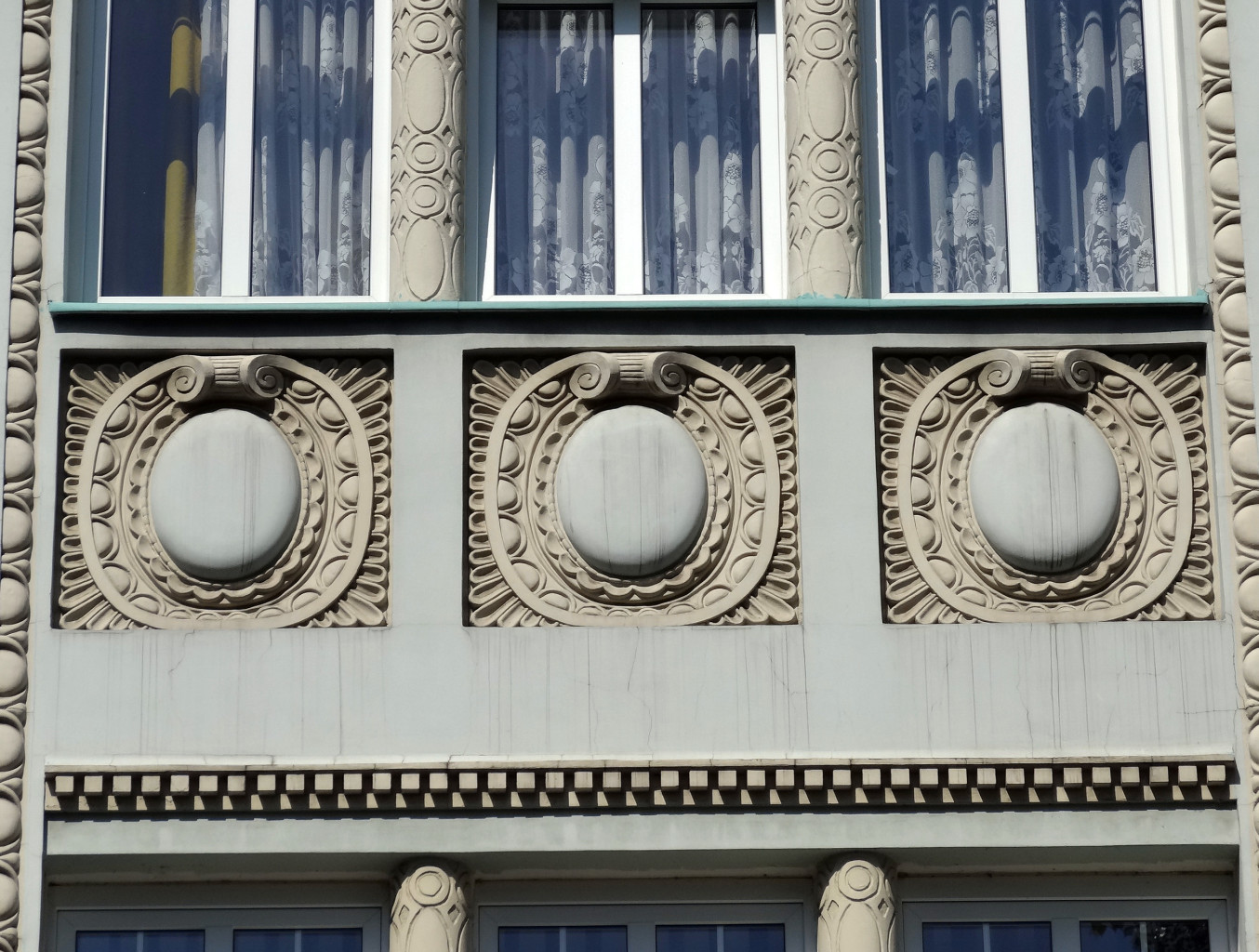
Art Nouveau motifs

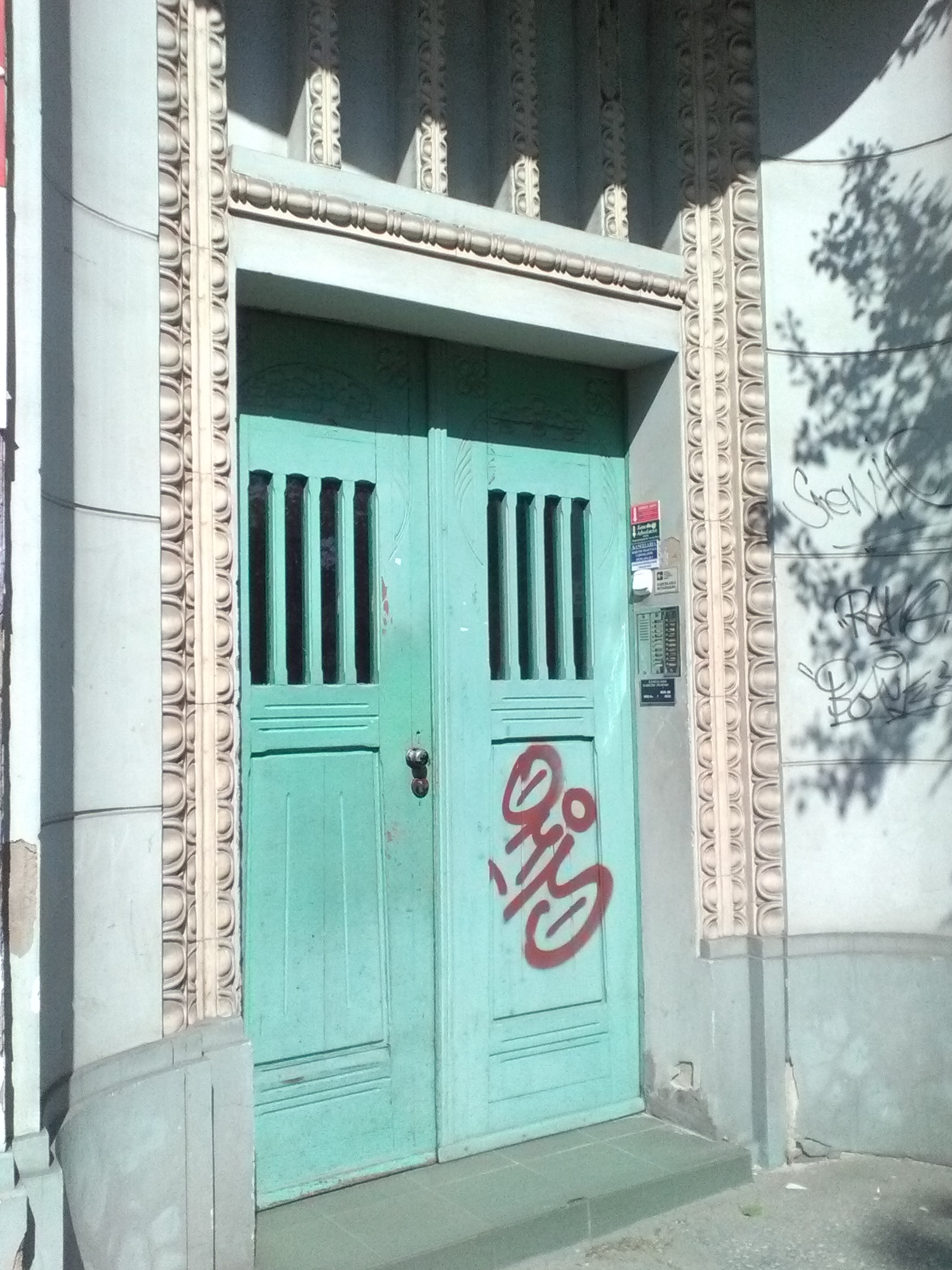
Main door ornamentation

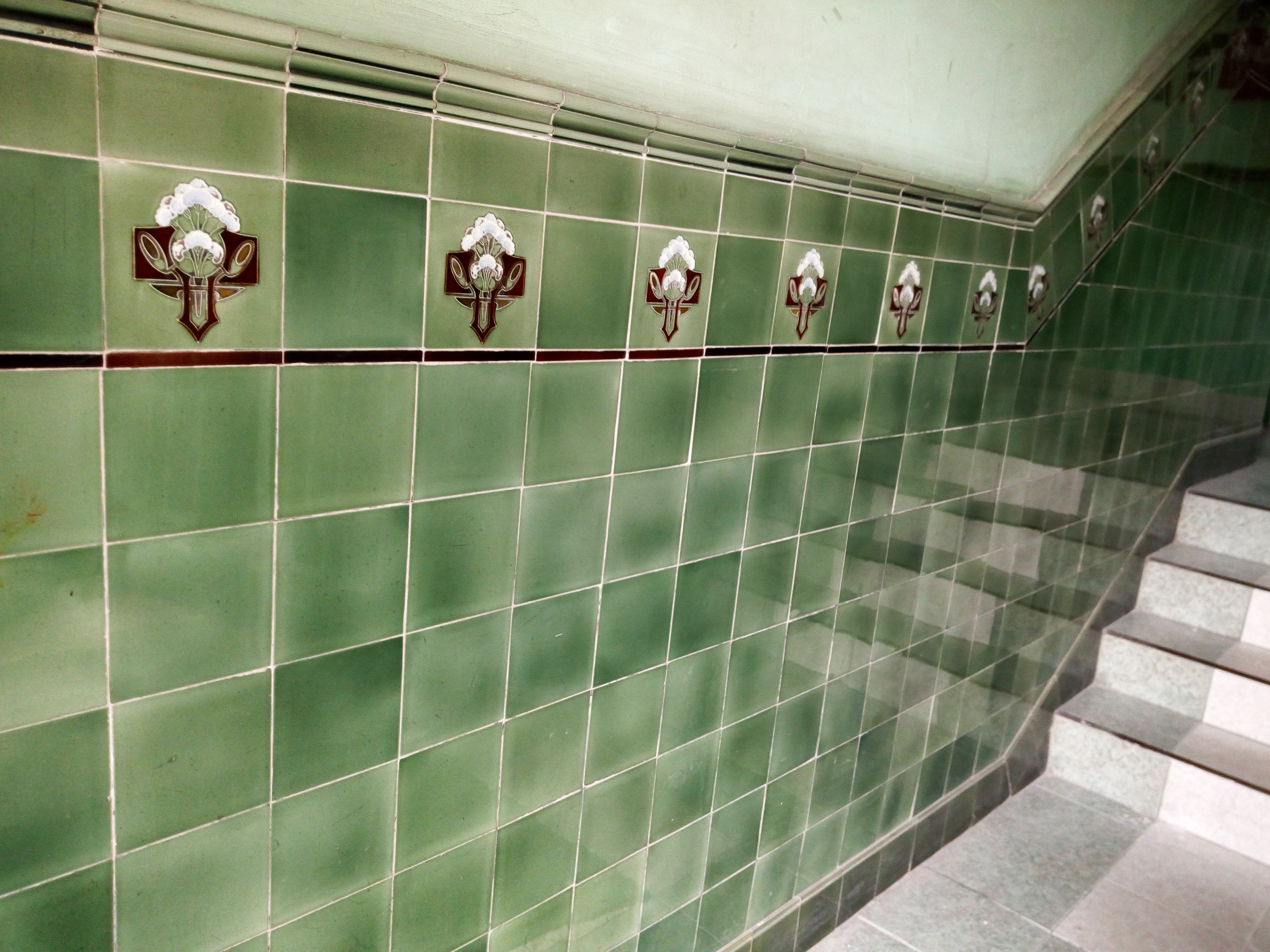
Glazed tiling in the staircase

Tenement house at 10

1912, by Albert Schleusener

Art Nouveau, elements of Early modernism

The same Friedrich Härzer, landlord of Nr.6 and 8, was the commissioner of this building registered at the time at Petersonstraße 12.

Compared to the abutting tenements at Nr.6 or 8, the frontage of Nr.10 definitely refers to Art Nouveau standards. The arched entrance portal is adorned with the 12 zodiac signs, while above, balconies pile up, adorned with wrought iron railings and geometric motifs. Similarly to Nr.8, one can notice the presence of a massive bay window with cartouches, pilasters and ornamented lintels. On both sides, many other cartouches brighten up the facade. On the top stand a loggia crowned by a circular roof and a creative curving gable. Be that as it may, the Art Nouveau decoration is balanced by early modernist influence in the presence of geometric shapes everywhere, from the main entrance to the window openings, from the cartouche fillings to the lank rectangular pilasters.

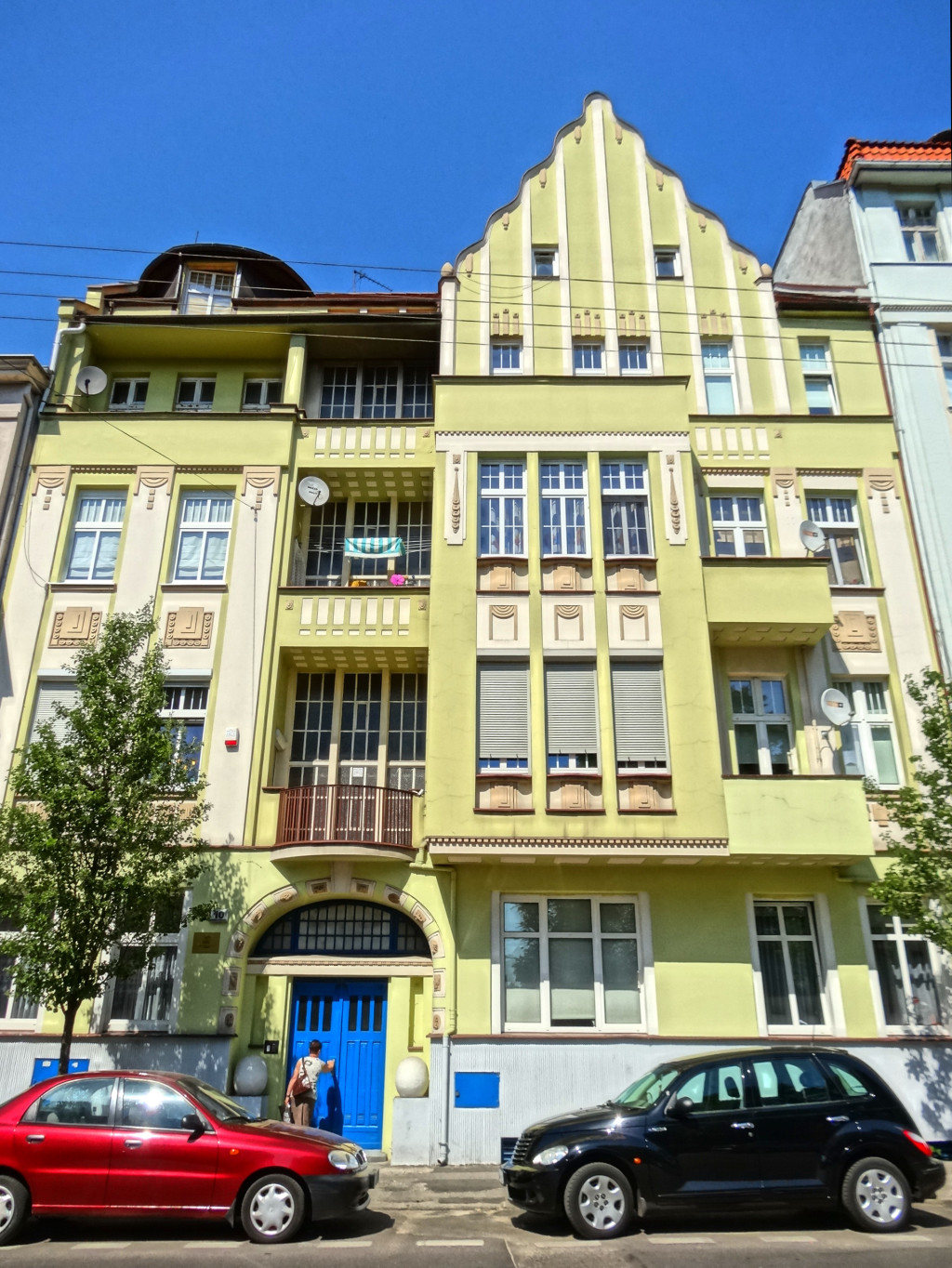
Main frontage

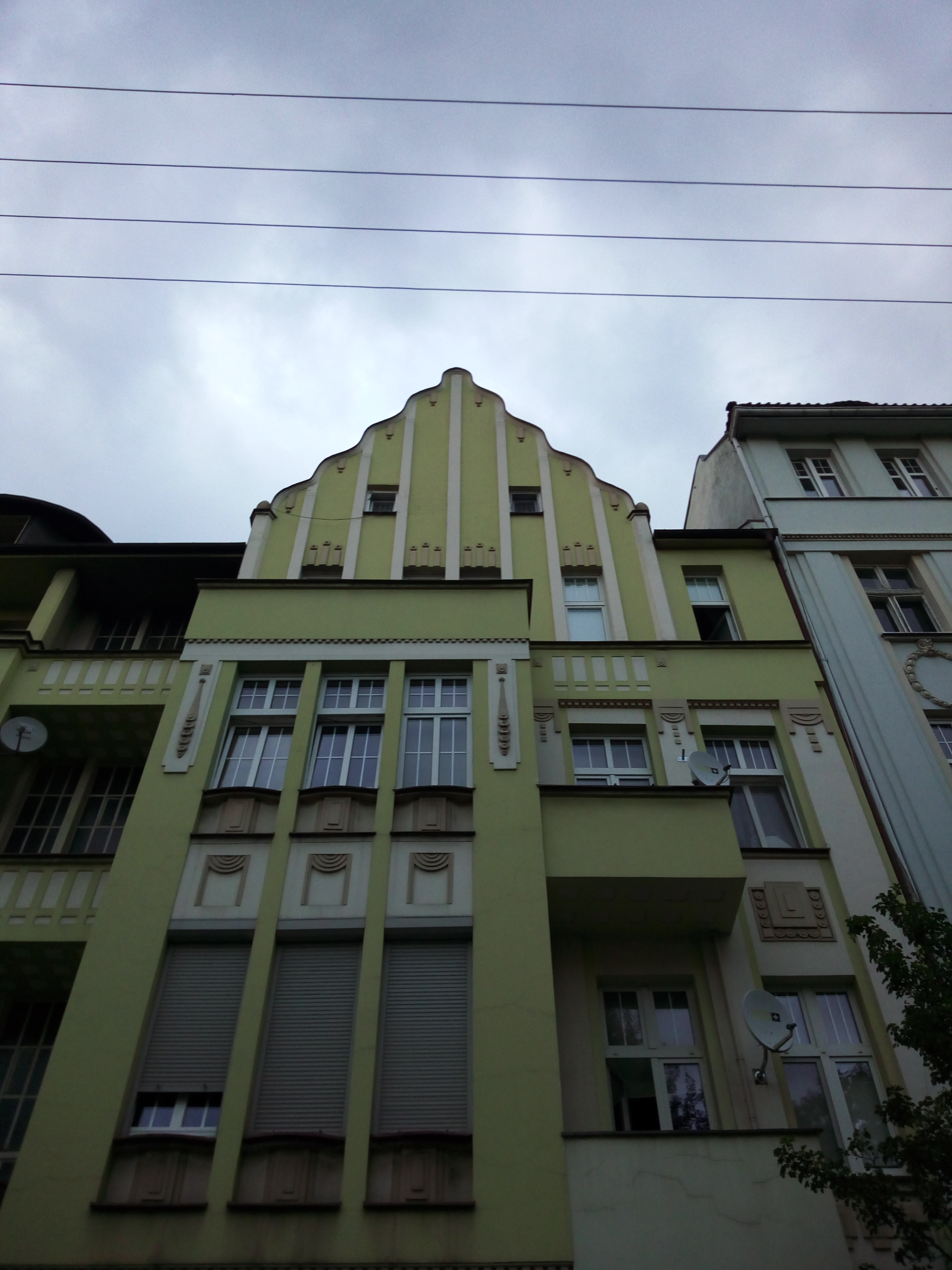
Bay window details

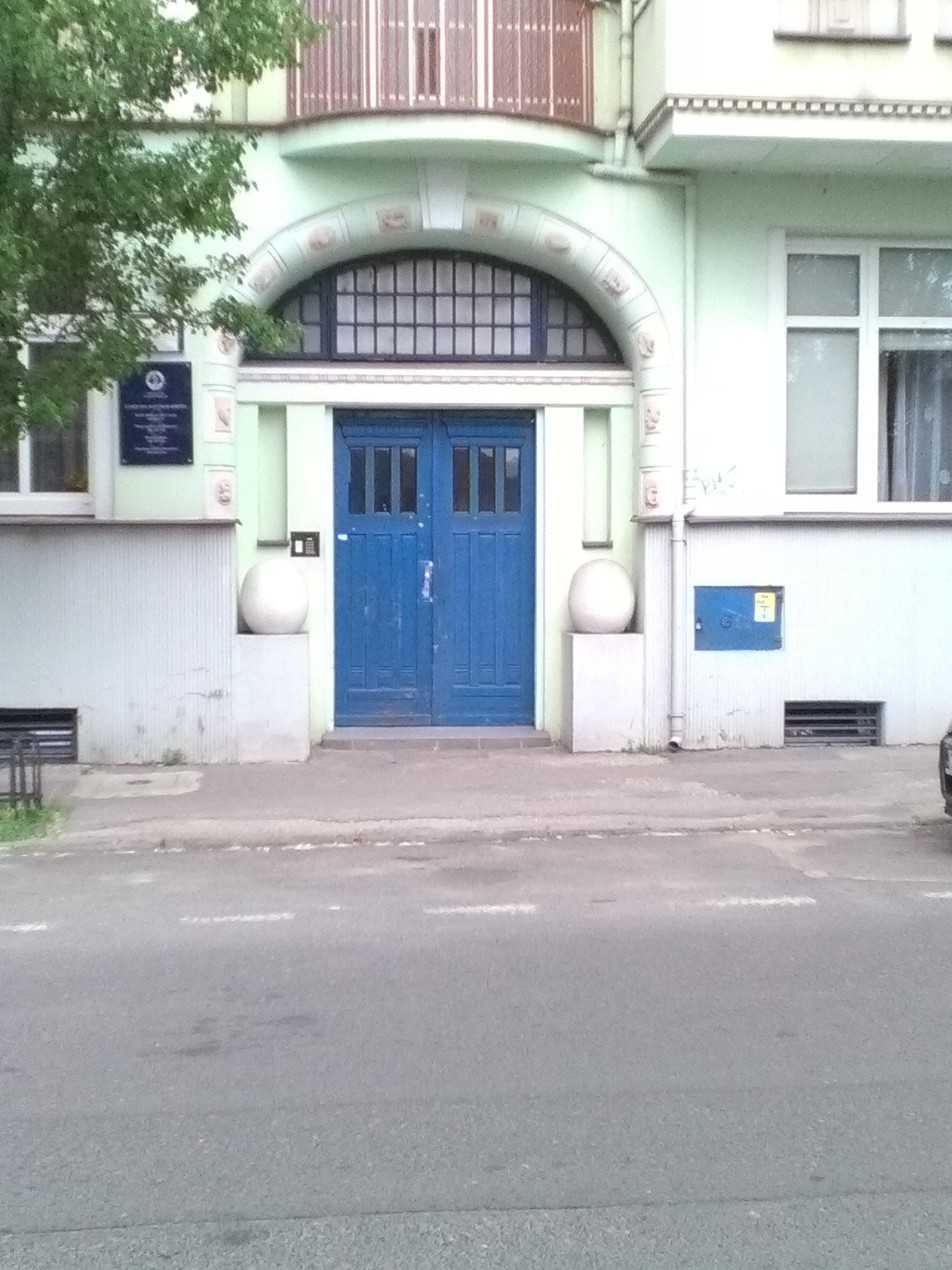
Main portal

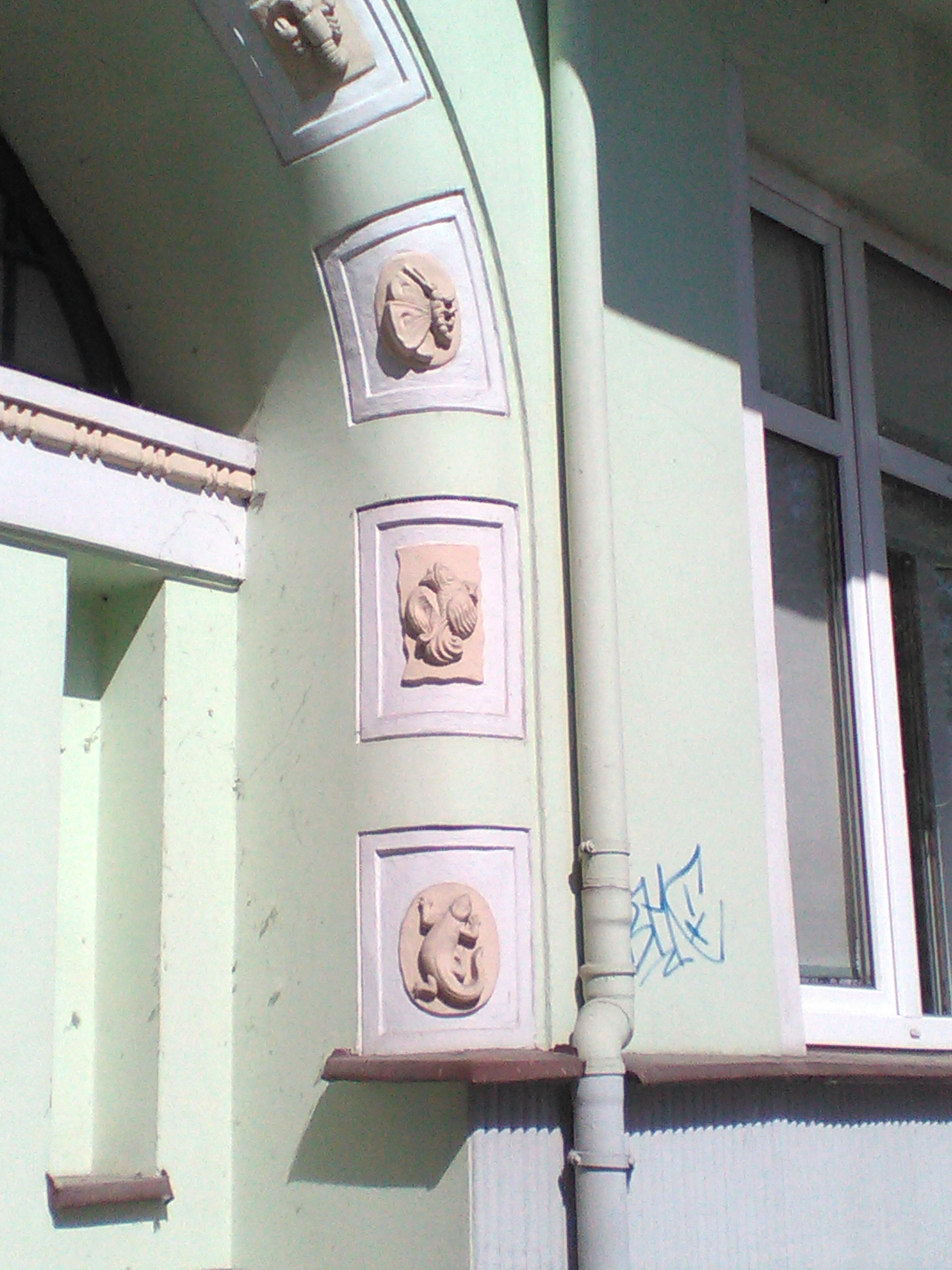
Zodiac signs around the main entrance

Mural on tenement at 11

The gigantic and colorful mural stands on the western wall of the house at Nr.11. It was created in four days (April 24–28, 2013), during the annual Animocje Festival, Bydgoszcz International Animated Film Festival. The artwork has been realized by Chazme and Sepe, two leading figures of street art in Poland. The mural represents the artists' vision of the Penrose stairs.

It is part of a collection of more than 20 mural works one can appreciate in Bydgoszcz streets.

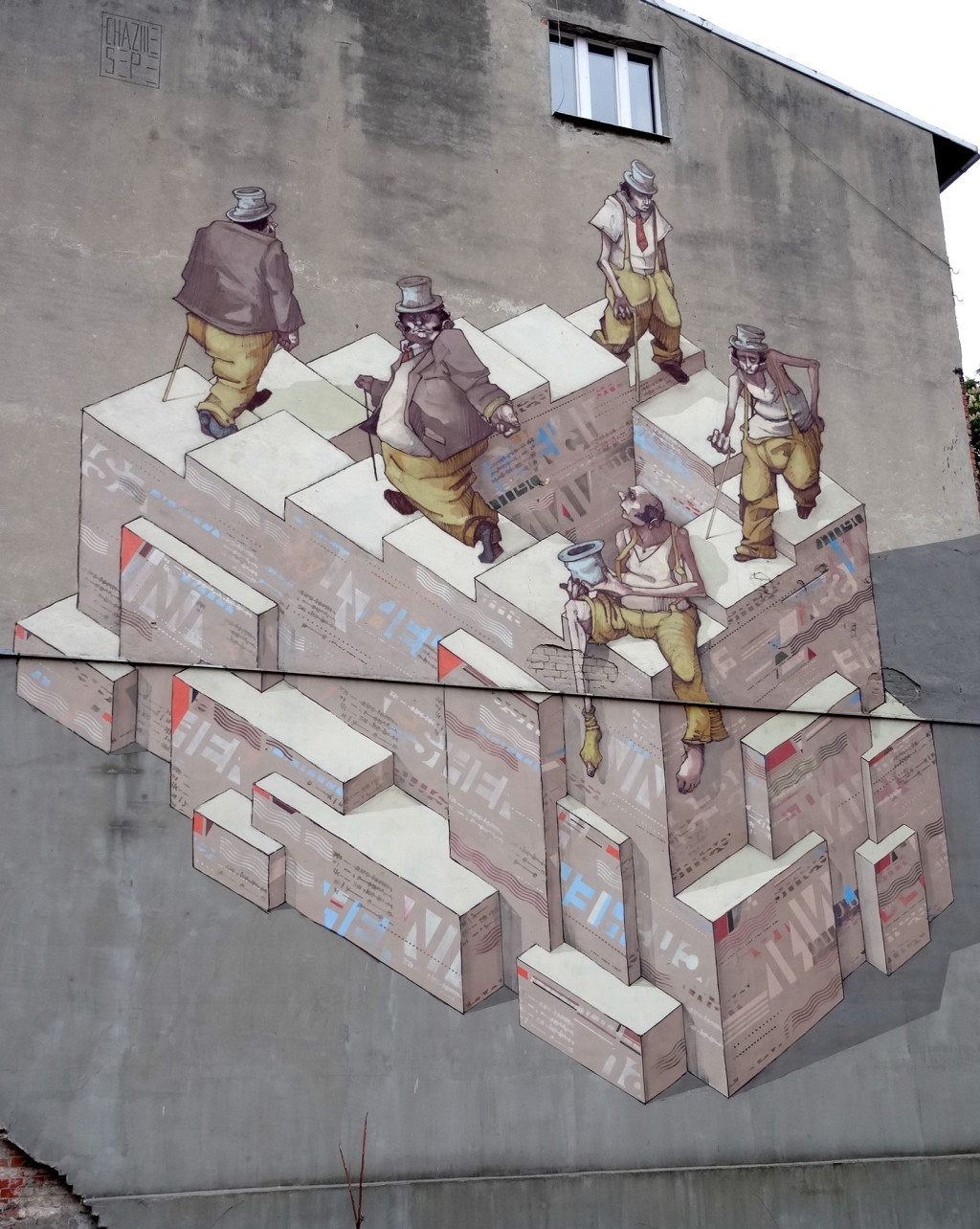
Mural at Nr.11

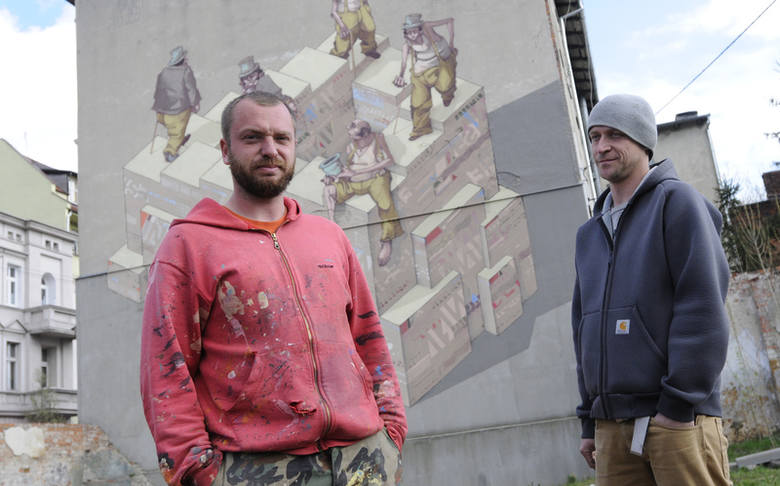
The authors in front of their work

Tenement house at 12

1893

Eclecticism

Mr von ßarnszewski, a merchant not living in Bydgoszcz, was the first owner of this building till the end of the 19th century. Later on, several different landlords came in succession, from the turn of the 20th century to the start of WWI.

Recently refurbished, the frontage boasts eclectic features, with two large balconies and a nicely crafted wood-and-glass entrance door topped by a fan transom light.

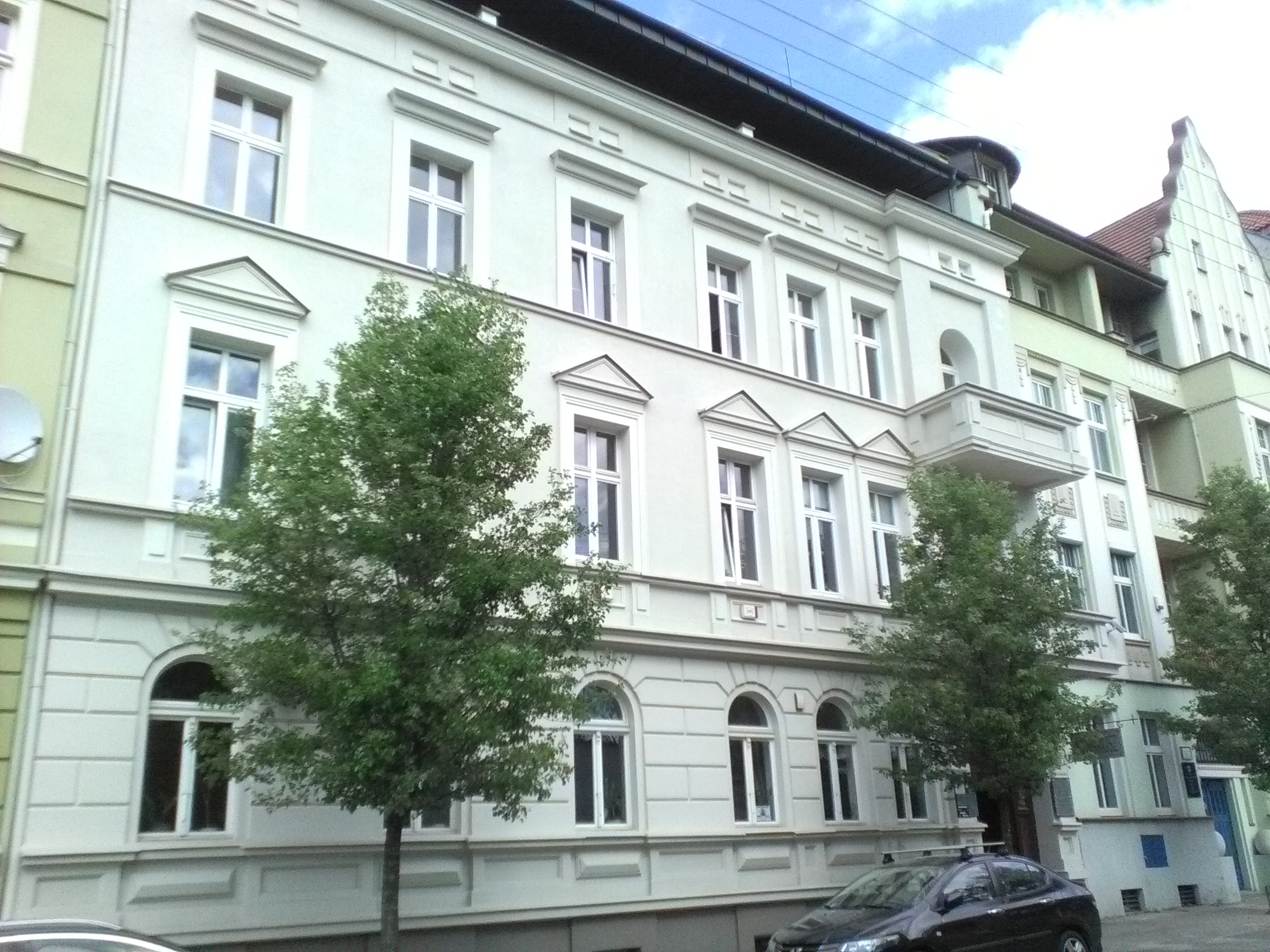
Refurbished facade

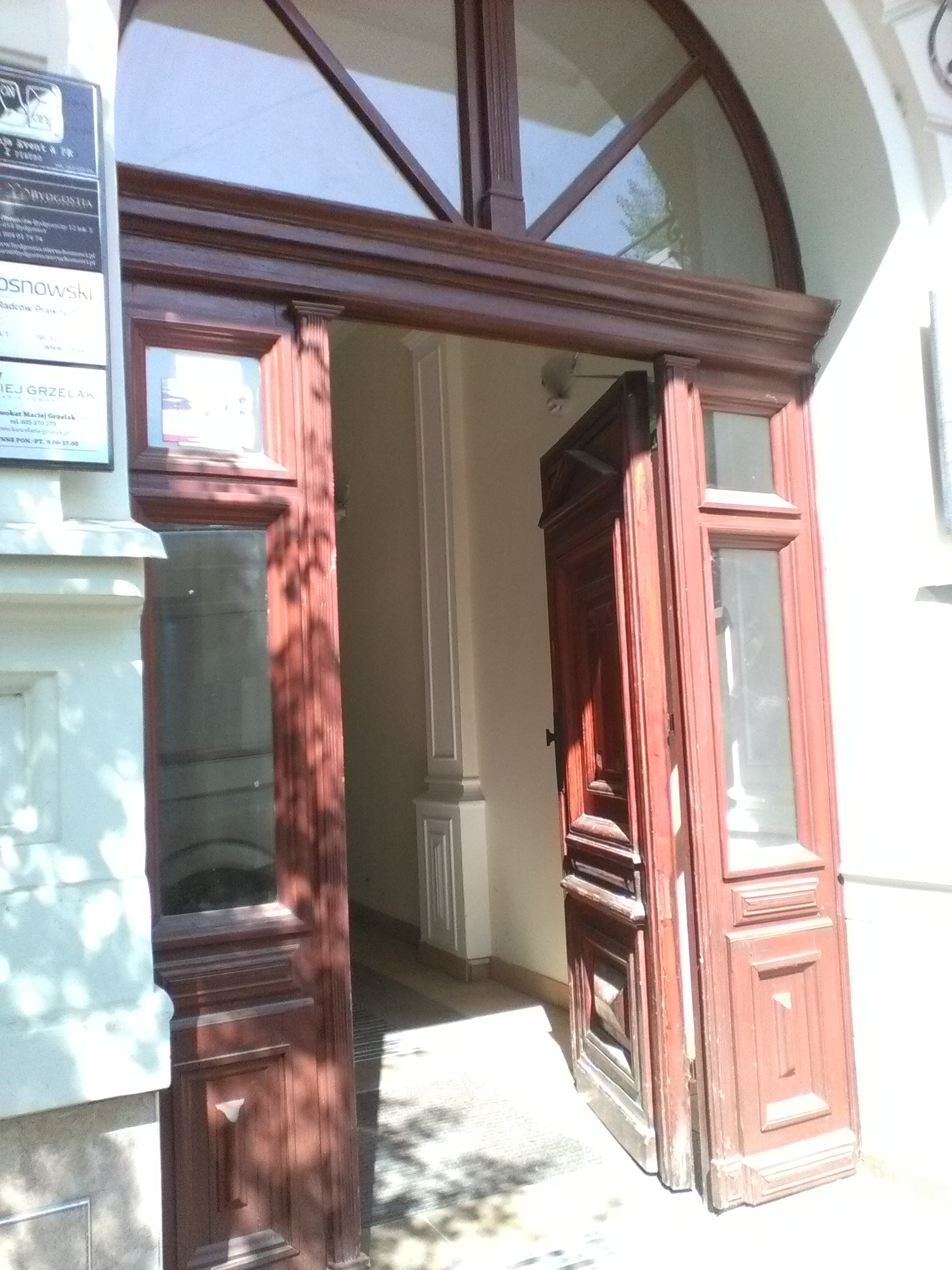
Main entrance door

Former factory BEFANA at 13

1852

Industrial architecture

The site was first a river shipyard, established in 1885 by entrepreneur Leopold Zober, on an area of 0.5 ha, where initially were produced steam boilers and steam locomotives, machines and ship accessories. Taken over by Polish capital, the firm name was changed to Granogsa and Kozłowski (1915), building black tools (spades, axes, pickaxes...) and files, to Bydgoska FAbryka NArzędzi (transl. Bydgoszcz Factory of Files and Tools) in 1923, shortened to BEFANA. Between 1927 and 1939, BEFANA became the biggest file producer in Poland. The company also produced forged tools (hammers, pincer pliers, etc.), in majority to the benefit of the agricultural market.

During World War II the factory's military administration dedicated the production to the army, but no sooner than on February 14, 1945, after the liberation of Bydgoszcz, the factory resumed its regular production. On October 1, 1989, the firm was transformed into a joint venture with foreign capital and changed its name to Befana-Vis, exporting to many European, African and Asian countries as well as American markets. In 2008, new CEO Witold Kaczyński moved the company's headquarters from downtown to a modern production hall in the newly established Bydgoszcz Industrial and Technological Park. The historic site was left abandoned: partly razed, only few buildings still stand today as witness of the feverish industrial age of the place. On May 30, 2019, the city of Bydgoszcz has made known the company in charge of the rewamping of the abandoned lot: AWZ Deweloper. The design will comprise habitation building as well as offices.

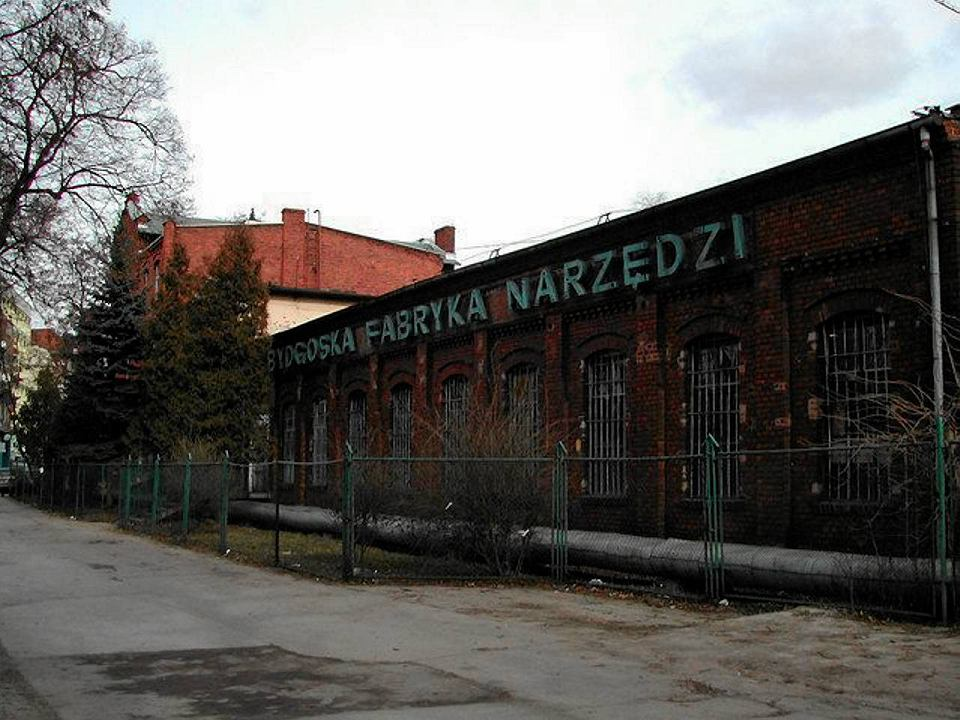
Former factory building ca 2009

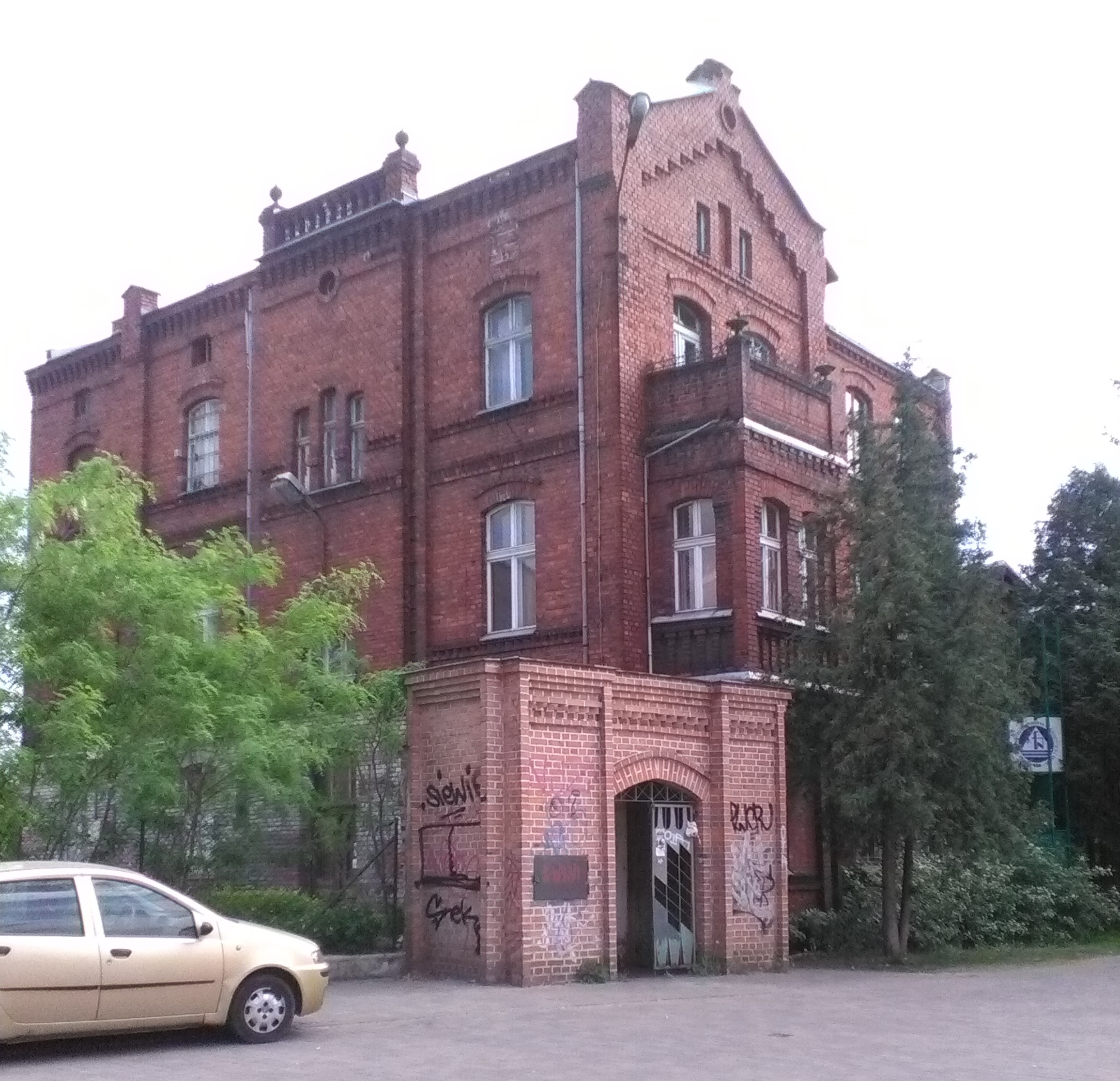
Factory building

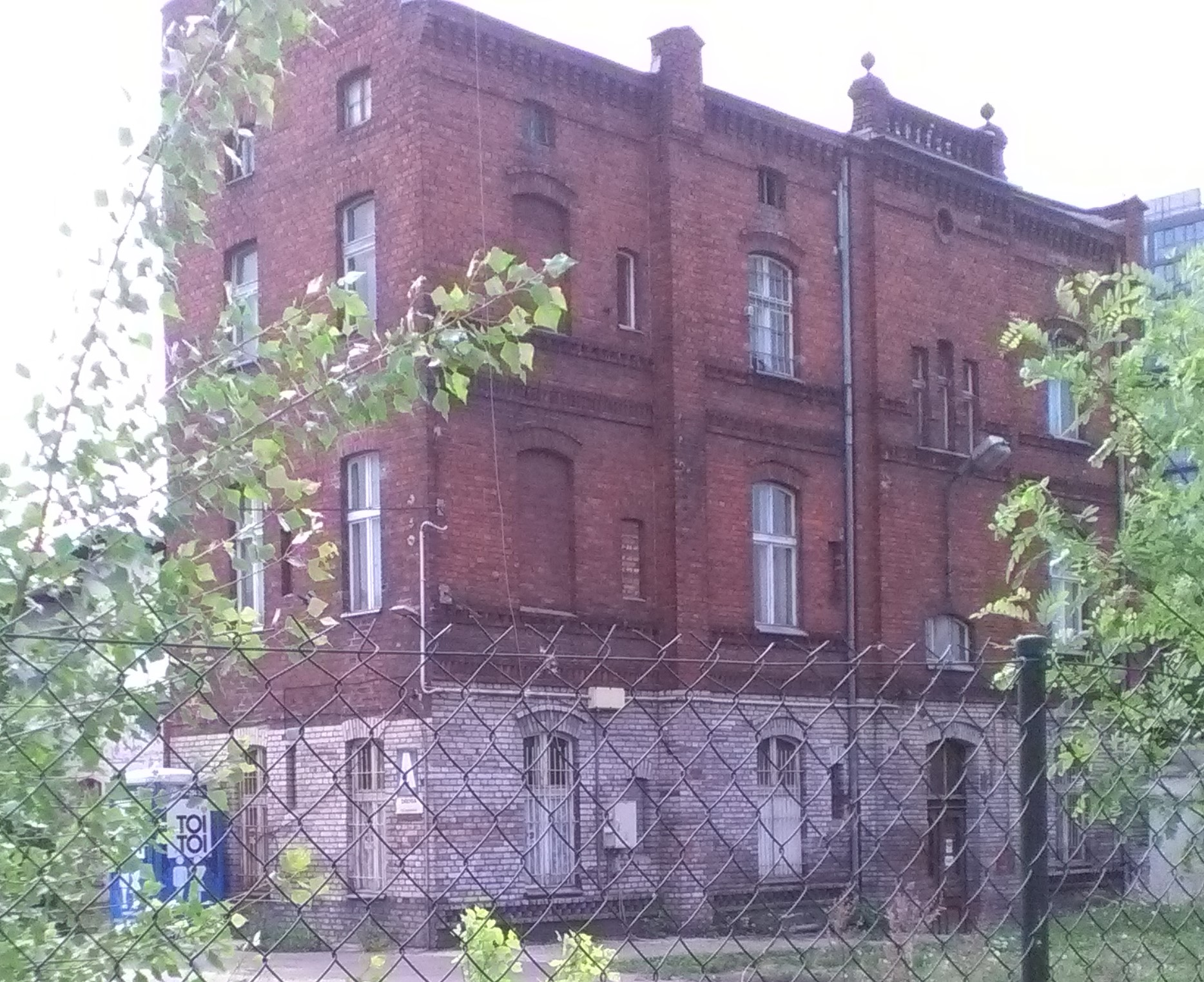
Left building from the street

Tenement house at 14

Early 1890s

Eclecticism

Mr von ßarnszewski, owner of Nr.12 (then Petersonstraße 11), also possessed this tenement (Petersonstraße 10). Several different landlords succeeded next, from the start of the 20th century onwards.

Recently refurbished, the frontage displays nice eclectic features:

- balconies with balustrade and stuccoed corbels;
- pedimented windows flanked by pilasters;
- an ornamented motif crowning the facade;
- a table corbel at the top of the elevation;
- an entrance door topped by a fan transom light.
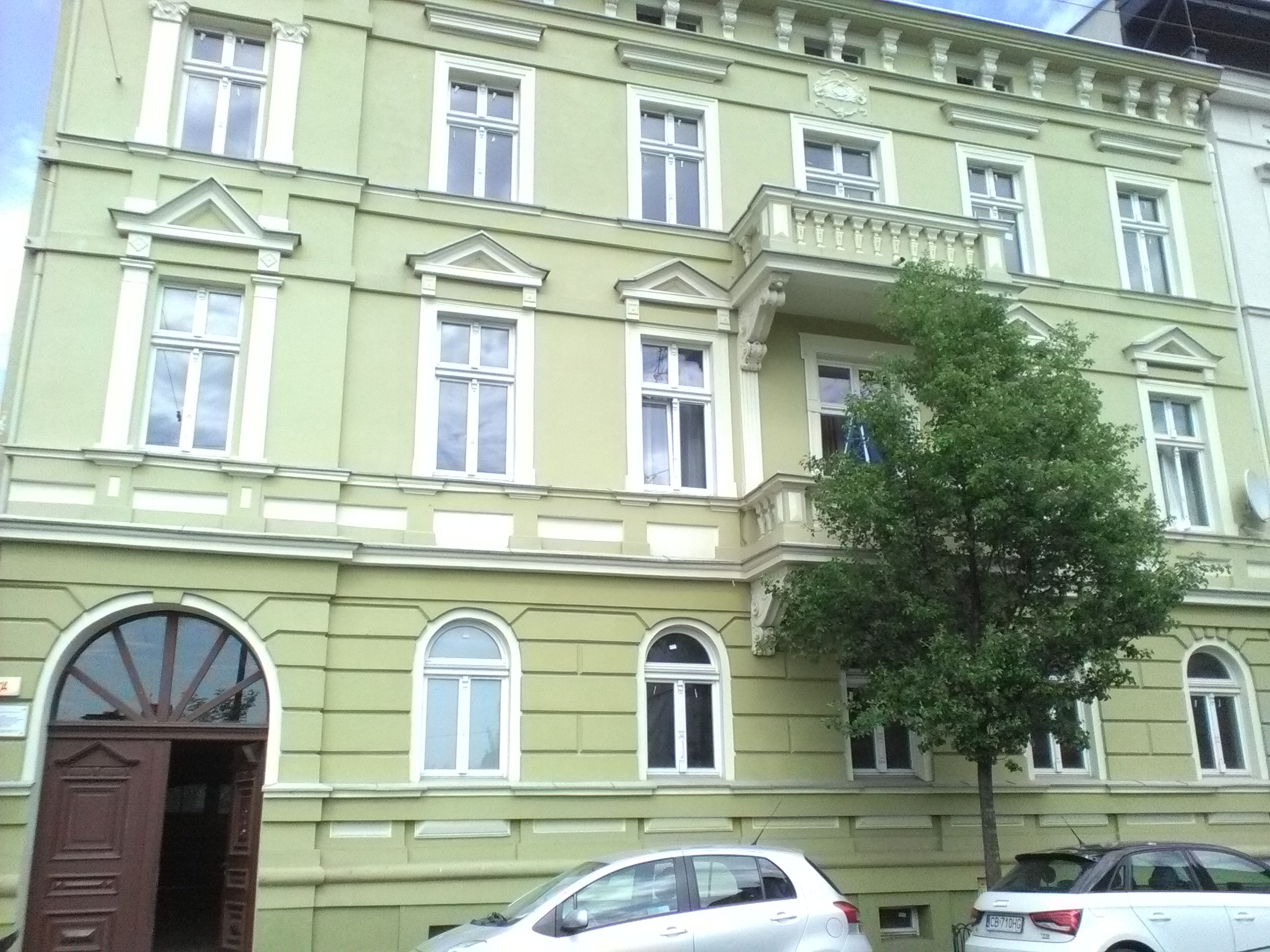
Main frontage

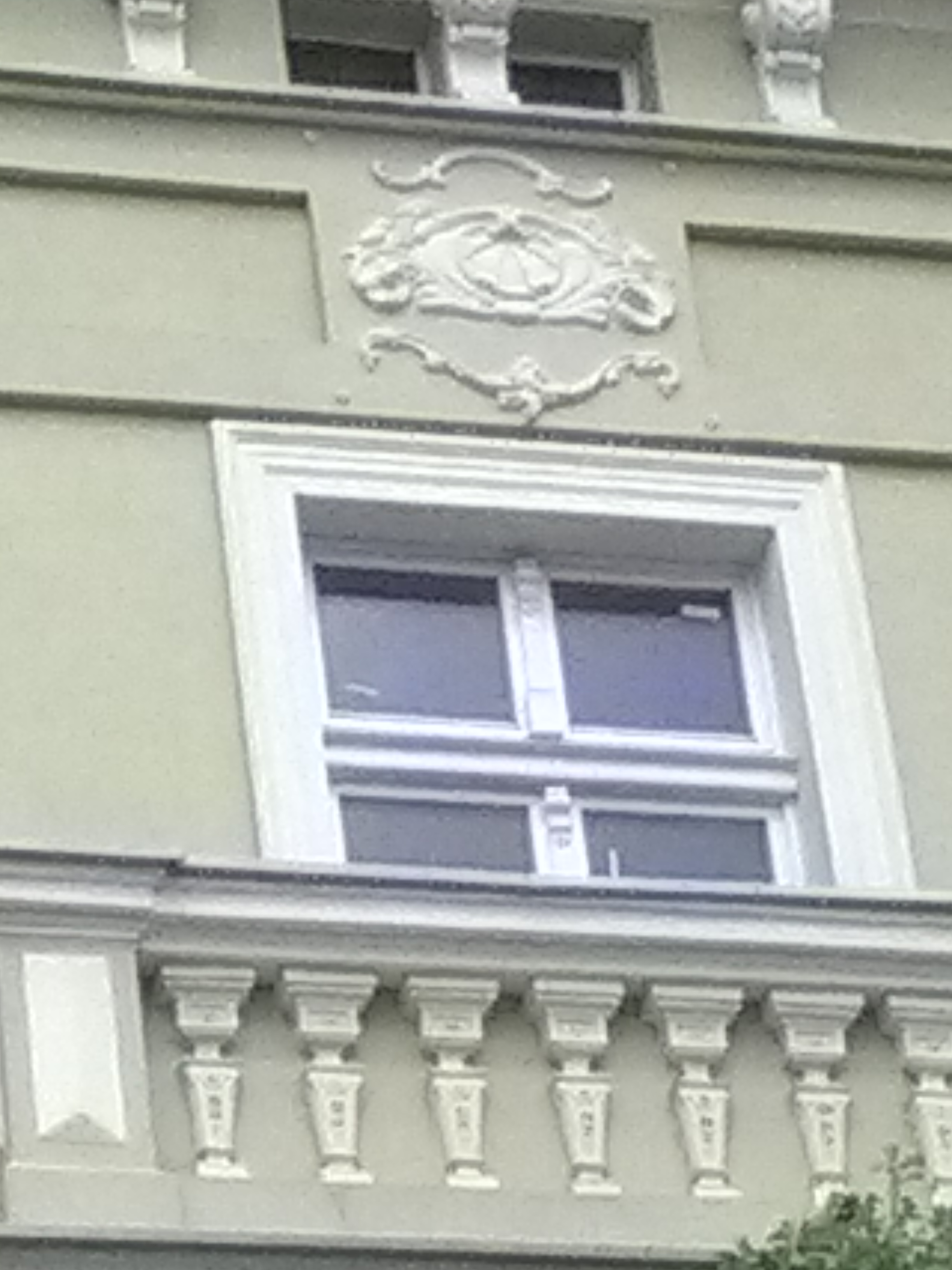
Ornament on top of the facade

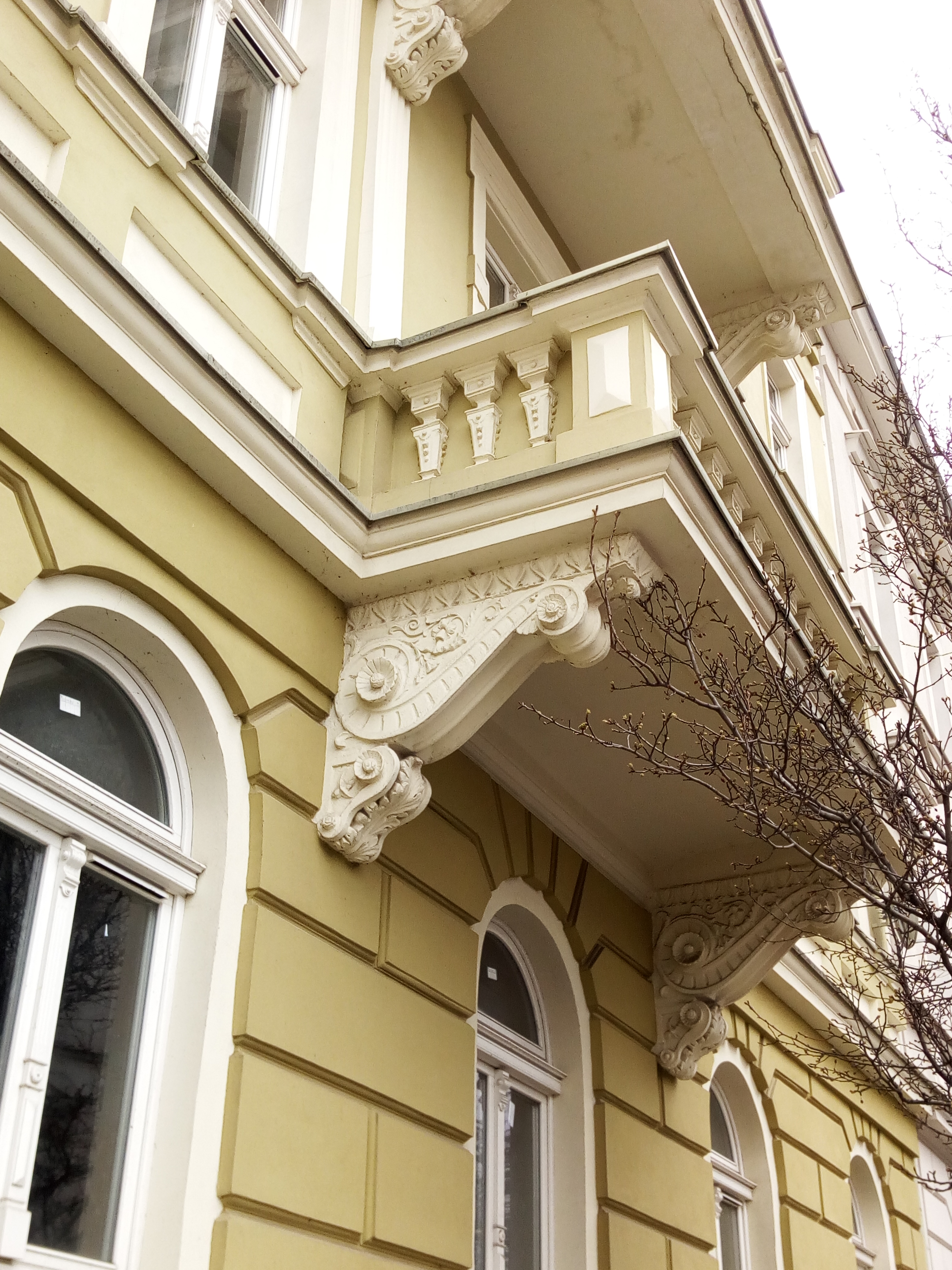
Adorned balcony

Tenement house at 16, corner with Marcinkowskiego street

1875-1900

Eclecticism & Neo-classicism

First known owner was Emil Großmann, a geometer, in 1880. At the time, the building was referenced under the crossing street addressing, then Fischerstraße 6, since Petesonstraße (Obrońców Bydgoszczy street) was only being built. His widow, then his son August kept the ownership of the house till 1900. In the early 1910s, the edifice has been housing a restaurant run by Carl Bartz for several decades. It is still the case today.

Despite a recent renovation, few architectural elements sustained the test of time.

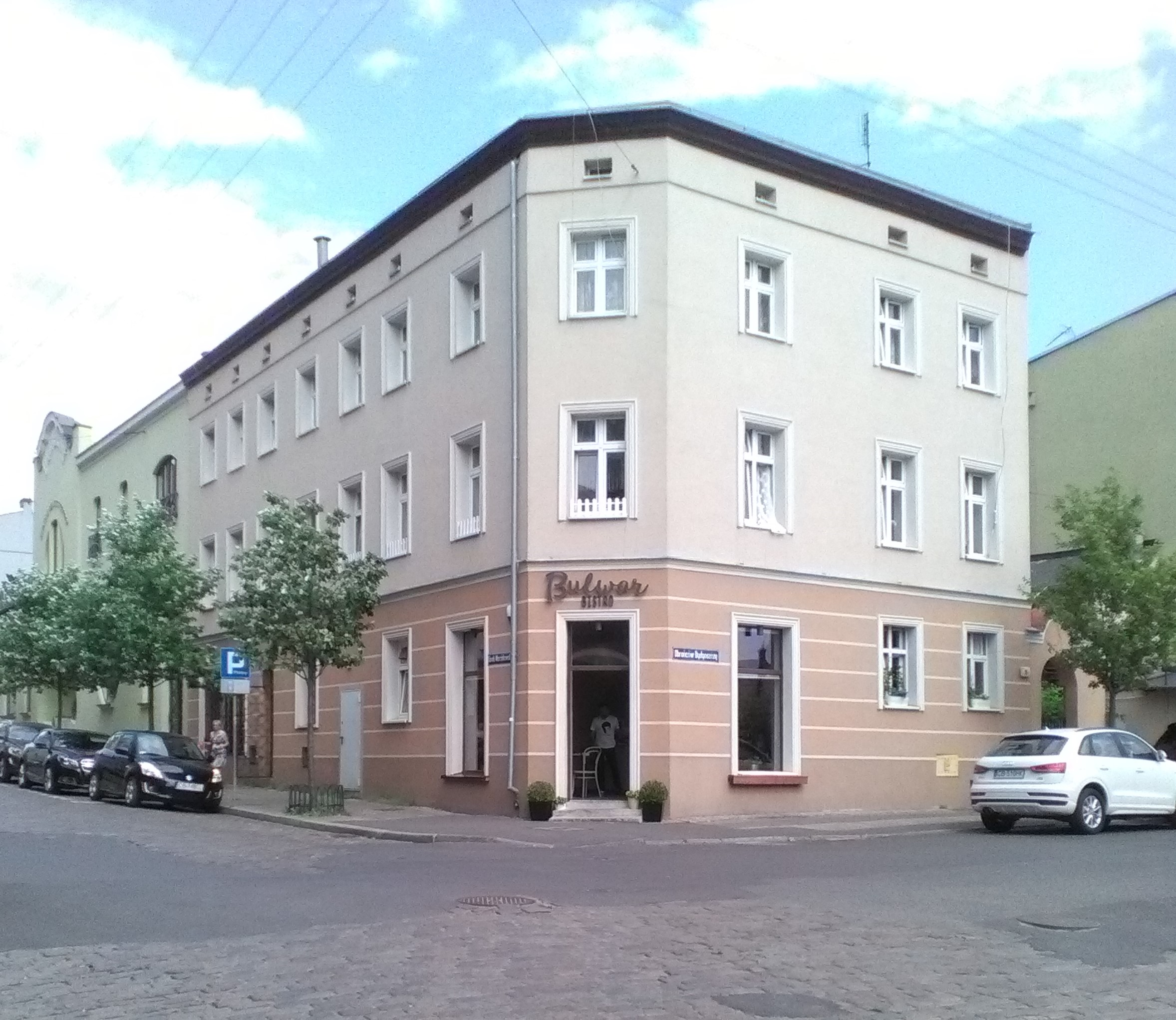
View from the street

== See also ==
- Bydgoszcz

== Bibliography ==
- Bręczewska-Kulesza, Daria (2004). Nowoczesna dzielnica mieszkaniowa z początku XX w. Kronika Bydgoska T26 (in Polish). Bydgoszcz: Towarzystwo Miłosnikow Miasta Bydgoszczy-Bydgoskie Towarzystwo Naukowe. pp. 69–94.
