= Maria Merkert =

German Roman Catholic professed religious

Blessed Maria Luise Merkert
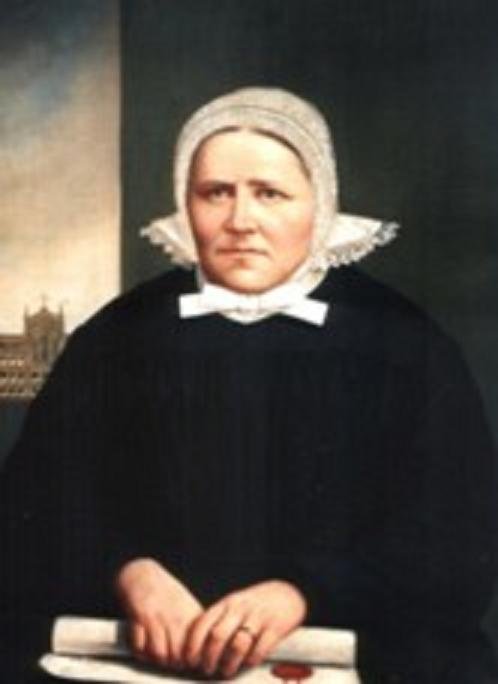
- Painting.

Religious
- Born: 21 September 1817; Neisse, Prussia
- Died: 14 November 1872 (aged 55); Neisse, Prussia
- Venerated in: Roman Catholic Church
- Beatified: 30 September 2007, Cathedral of Ss. James and Agnes, Nysa, Poland by Cardinal José Saraiva Martins
- Feast: 14 November
- Attributes: Religious habit
- Patronage: Sisters of Saint Elizabeth

Maria Luise Merkert (21 September 1817 in Neisse, Prussia - 14 November 1872 in Neisse) was a German Roman Catholic professed religious and the co-foundress of the Sisters of Saint Elizabeth. Merkert worked to help those in need including the poor and ill and tended to them with her older sister until her sudden death and the death of her other companions - this left Merkert alone to found and maintain her order as its first Superior General from 1859 until her death.

Merkert's beatification was celebrated under Pope Benedict XVI in Poland on 30 September 2007 with Cardinal José Saraiva Martins presiding over the celebration on the pope's behalf.

== Life ==
Maria Luise Merkert was born on 21 September 1817 in Neisse, Prussia in the Province of Silesia as the second and last daughter born to the pious middle-class Anton Merkert and Maria Barbara Pfitzner; her sole sibling was older sister Matilde. Merkert was baptized on 22 September 1817. Her father died when she was nine months old on 21 June 1818.

Merkert and her older sister Matilde attended the local girls' school. Merkert assisted her mother during her illness prior to her death from tuberculosis on 11 July 1842. From this experience she decided to serve the poor as well as the sick and abandoned. That September she and Matilde as well as Frances Werner - on the advice of her confessor - joined Clara Wolff (a Third Order Franciscan) in her charitable work of serving the poor and sick in their homes and titled their movement as the "Association of Sisters for the Assistance of Abandoned Sick under the Protection of the Most Sacred Heart of Jesus" on 27 September 1842. Also on 27 September 1842 she had attended mass with her companions and all of them vowed before an image of the Sacred Heart to aid all those people in need.

The priest Francis Xavier Fischer blessed their work while on 31 July 1844 the first five religious - including herself - signed the statutes for this movement though the number of signatories soon dropped to four on 8 May 1846 with Merkert's sister's death from typhus. Fischer then encouraged the surviving members to enter the novitiate with the Sisters of Saint Charles Borromeo in Prague and on 25 December 1846 began their religious formation there. She and Werner left the order on 30 June 1850 and returned to their own apostolic work seeing the order as unsuitable for them. Wolff later died on 4 January 1853 from injuries she suffered in late 1852 while leaving a patient.

On 19 November 1850 she started in her hometown the Sisters of Saint Elizabeth to care for abandoned patients in their own homes and that December submitted the statutes for the order as well as the names of those involved in it. On 4 September 1859 the Bishop of Breslau Heinrich Förster granted diocesan approval for the association and recognized it as a religious congregation. That October he approved its statutes while the first General Chapter held on 15 December 1859 saw her appointed as the order's first Superior General - she held that position until her death. On 5 May 1860 the members of the congregation made their solemn vows. Pope Pius IX granted the order the decree of praise on 7 June 1871.

Merkert died on 14 November 1872 from typhus. Her remains were interred in the cathedral after their transferral there on 16 July 1964 while being moved once more to the side chapel of the cathedral on 19 September 1998 after her remains were inspected for the canonization cause. Her congregation now operates in places such as Lithuania and Russia and it received full papal approval on 26 January 1887 from Pope Leo XIII.

== Beatification ==
The beatification process opened in the Diocese of Opole in a diocesan process that the then-Bishop Alfons Nossol opened on 19 February 1985 and later concluded on 9 September 1997. The Congregation for the Causes of Saints issued the official "nihil obstat" on 2 July 1985 and therefore titled her as a Servant of God; the C.C.S. later validated the diocesan process on 27 February 1998 and received the Positio from the postulation in 2000.

Historians assessed and approved the cause on 11 December 2001 as did theologians on 12 October 2004 and the C.C.S. on 14 December 2004 while Pope John Paul II confirmed her heroic virtue on 20 December 2004 and named her as Venerable as a result. The miracle needed for beatification was investigated and then ratified on 28 March 2003 before receiving approval from a medical board on 30 June 2005 and theologians on 13 June 2006; the C.C.S. did likewise on 19 December 2006 before turning it over to Pope Benedict XVI who approved it on 1 June 2007.

Cardinal José Saraiva Martins presided over Merkert's beatification in Poland on 30 September 2007 on the behalf of Benedict XVI. Her liturgical feast was affixed for the date of her death.

The current postulator assigned to this cause is Andrea Ambrosi.
