= Sisters of Saint Elizabeth =

The Sisters of Saint Elizabeth are a Roman Catholic religious institute. Generally styled "Grey Nuns" (to be distinguished from the Grey Nuns of Montreal).

== History ==
The Congregation of the Sisters of Saint Elizabeth (CSSE) was founded by an association of young ladies established by Dorothea Klara Wolff, in connection with the sisters, Mathilde and Maria Merkert, and Franziska Werner, in Nysa (Prussian Silesia), to tend in their own homes, without compensation, helpless sick persons who could not or would not be received into the hospitals.

In the early 19th century epidemics of cholera and typhus swept the Prussian Province of Silesia. As a result of their impoverished status, many Silesians would die homeless or spend their final days in poorhouses. Maria and Matilda Merket, Clara Wolf and Franciscka Verner banded together to provide assistance to the poor.

On November 19, 1850, Merkert started in Nysa the Association of St. Elizabeth to care for abandoned patients in their own homes. St. Elizabeth of Hungary was chosen as Patroness because she was well known for her kindness to the poor.

Without adopting any definite rule, they led a community life and wore a common dress, a brown woollen habit with a grey bonnet. For this reason they were soon called by the people the "Grey Nuns". As their work was soon recognized and praised everywhere, and as new members continually applied for admission, their spiritual advisers sought to give the association some sort of religious organization. They endeavoured, wherever possible, to affiliate it with already established confraternities having similar purposes. But their foremost desire was to educate the members for the care of the sick in hospitals. Great difficulties arose, and the attempt failed, principally through the resistance of the foundresses, who did not wish to abandon their original plan of itinerant nursing. Some of the newly admitted members then joined the Sisters of St. Charles Borromeo.

On September 4, 1859, Bishop of Wrocław Heinrich Förster gave diocesan approval for the association and recognized it as a congregation of the Catholic Church. A month later he approved its statutes. On May 5, 1860, the members of the congregation took vows of poverty, chastity and obedience, plus the additional vow to minister to the sick and the most needy. The congregation has a particular devotion to the Sacred Heart. Maria Merkert was elected the first superior general of the Sisters of St. Elizabeth, a position she held for thirteen years, until her death.

They speedily gained the sympathy of the sick of all classes and creeds, and also that of the physicians. New candidates applied for admission, and the sisters were soon able to extend the sphere of their activity beyond Neisse. Of especial importance was the foundation made at Breslau, where the work of the sisters came under the direct observation of the episcopal authorities. Soon after, on 4 September 1859, Prince-Bishop Heinrich Furster was prevailed upon by the favourable reports and testimonials to grant the association ecclesiastical approbation. As such a recognition presupposed a solid religious organization, a novitiate was established according to the statutes submitted. In the following year the twenty-four eldest sisters made the three religious vows. State recognition, with the grant of a corporate charter, was obtained by the confraternity on 25 May 1864, under the title, "Catholic Charitable Institute of St. Elizabeth", through the mediation of the Prussian Crown Prince Frederick William, subsequent Emperor of Germany, who had observed the beneficent activity of the sisters on the battlefields of Denmark.

On 26 January 1887, the approbation of the Holy See was granted for the Congregation of Sisters of St. Elizabeth. Thereafter, the congregation spread to Norway, Sweden, and Italy. After World War I, Sofija Smetonienė, wife of President Antanas Smetona, invited the Sisters of St. Elizabeth to Lithuania. Three sisters from Germany arrived in Kaunas in 1925 and Lithuanian girls would too soon begin to join the congregation. They stayed with the at sisters Benedictine sisters and began to care for patients at home. Even though its Lithuanian members totaled a meager fifteen sisters, the congregation to expand the scope of their charitable activities in Lithuania by starting an orphanage in Jurbarkas and founding a hospital in Švėkšna.
