= Carl Meyer =

Carl Meyer may refer to:

- Sir Carl Meyer, 1st Baronet (1851–1922), British banker and mining magnate
- Carl Meyer (rower) (born 1981), New Zealand rower
- Carl Meyer (sportsperson, born 1991), South African gridiron football player and former rugby union player
- Carl Walther Meyer (1898–1985), German film actor
- Carl Walter Meyer (1965–2017), South African artist
- Carl Friedrich Meyer (1757–1817), German legal scholar
- Carl Meyer (architect), German architect of, among many works, the Gasworks building, Bydgoszcz

== See also ==
- Carl Mayer (disambiguation)
- Karl Meyer (disambiguation)
