= Walter Mayer (disambiguation) =

Walter Mayer (born 1957) is an Austrian cross-country skier and coach. Walter Mayer, or similar, may also refer to:

- Walter A. Maier (1893–1950), radio personality, public speaker, author, and educator
- Walter Meier (1927–2017), German athlete
- Walter Meyer (1904–1949), German rower
- Wally Mayer (1890–1951), American baseball catcher
- Walther Mayer (1887–1948), Austrian mathematician
- Walther Meier (1910–1991), Swiss field hockey player

== See also ==
- Carl Walter Meyer (1965–2017), South African artist
- Walter Mair (born 1978), Austrian-born composer
- Walter Myers (disambiguation)
