= Church of the Savior, Bydgoszcz =

Lutheran Church in Kuyavian-Pomeranian, Poland

Coordinates: 53°08′00″N 17°59′47″E

Church of the Savior
- Polish: Kościół Zbawiciela w Bydgoszczy
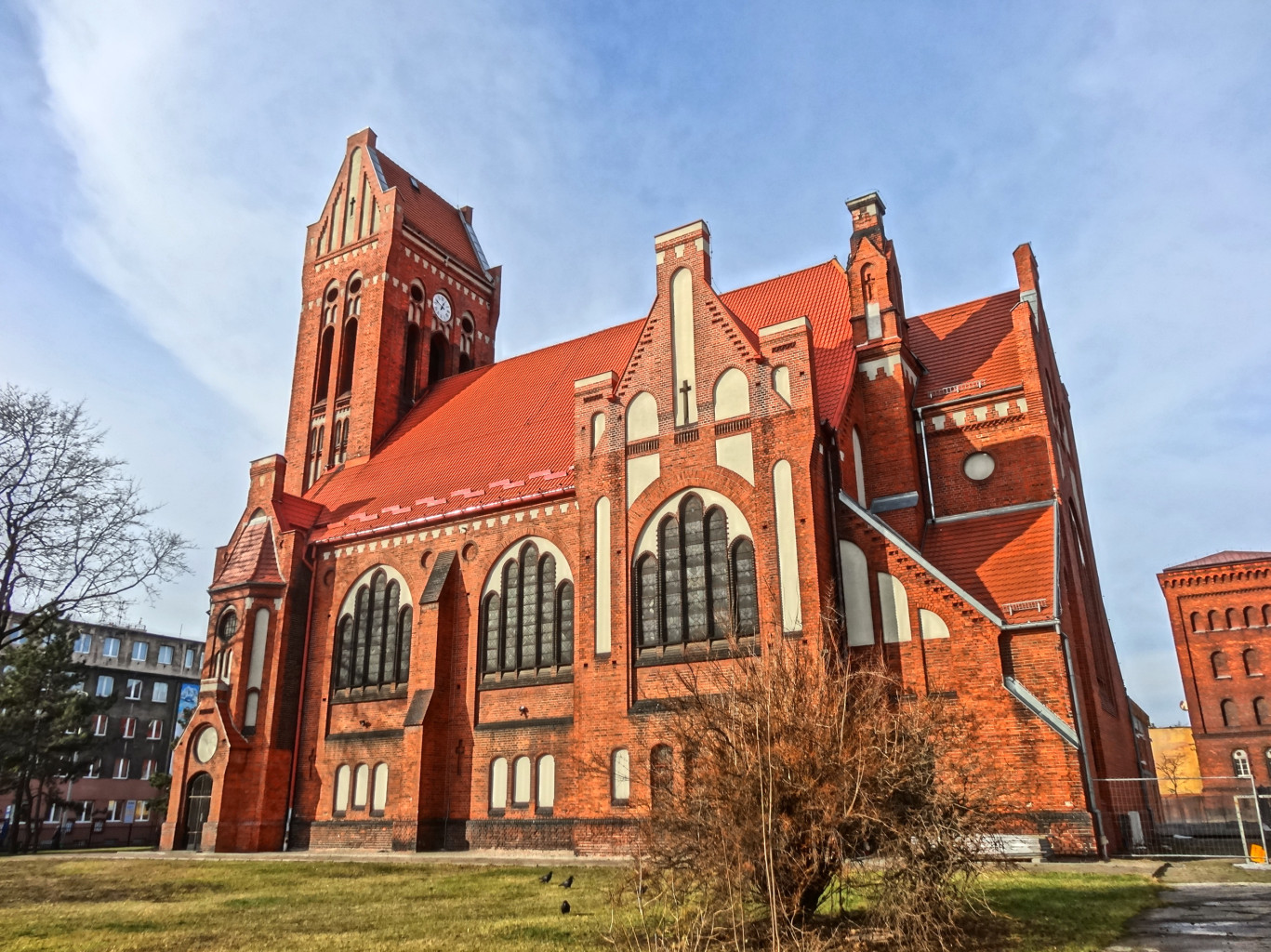
- Church of the Savior, Bydgoszcz
- Church of the Savior
- Location: 10 Warszawska street, Bydgoszcz
- Country: Poland
- Denomination: Lutheran Church
- Website: http://www.bydgoszcz.luteranie.pl/

History
- Status: Church
- Dedication: Christ the Savior
- Dedicated: 19 June 1913

Architecture
- Functional status: Active
- Heritage designation: Nr.601239, A/897, 7 November 2005
- Architect(s): Heinrich Seeling, Jan Kossowski (1945)
- Architectural type: Neo-Gothic
- Completed: 1897

Specifications
- Materials: Brick

The Church of the Savior is a neo-Gothic Lutheran church in Bydgoszcz. Located on Savior Square (Polish: Plac Zbawiciela) along Warszawska Street, it was called Christ Church (Polish: Kościoł Chrystusa) till 1945. The edifice church has been registered on the Kuyavian-Pomeranian Voivodeship Heritage list on 7 November 2005.

== History ==
The church was built on the site of an old Protestant cemetery of a former farm in Bocianowo (Bocianowo is now a district of Bydgoszcz). In the 1850s, the area was directly impacted by the development of the railway: as a consequence, a large German population settled in the district to take part in the working effort, spanning from the 1870s to the 1900s. Being in majority from protestant faith, the presence of this new community called for the construction a church. The edifice was of modest nature but also of monumental expression, hence expressing its bonds with the nearby proletarian and garrison populations living in the immediate vicinity of the train station.

The designer of the temple was the architect Heinrich Seeling from Berlin who also conceived in Bydgoszcz:

- the non-extant Municipal Theatre (1895–1896);
- the Saint Andrew Bobola's Church (1901–1903);
- Emil Werckmeister's tenement at 4 Jagiellońska street (end of the 1890s);
- Villa Heinrich Dietz at 48 Gdańska Street 1897–1898).

The design was penned on 21 March 1894: at the time, construction costs amounted to 120,000 Deutsche Mark The foundation stone of the Christ church (German: Christuskirche) took place on 28 March 1896 and the consecration occurred on 27 October 1897 by Dr. Johannes Hesekiel. In 1901, a square was created around the edifice, which is delimited by present-day streets Warszawska, Aleksander Fredro, John III Sobieski and Józef Sowiński. Until the 1930s, the temple welcomed only the German Evangelical community of Bydgoszcz, later it also received the Polish faithful.

During 1945 fightings, the tented roof tower was demolished. After WWII, the church was shortly taken over by the local Catholic Church, but soon was returned to the Evangelical-Augsburg Parish and re-consecrated on 9 December 1945 as Church of the Savior (Polish: Kościół Zbawiciela). The tower was rebuilt according to the design of the architect Jan Kossowski.

In 1947, a figure of Christ was placed in front of the temple: it is a copy of the work of Bertel Thorvaldsen from Copenhagen, modeled on the figure standing in the Church of Our Lady, Copenhagen. This statue comes from the tomb of the Blumwe family, located in the cemetery at Jagiellońska street, liquidated in 1951-1952 (nowadays Ludowy Park). The church was renovated in 1983 and in 2018-2020, a restoration of the tower is planned, to rectify the removal in the 1990s of the steep gable covering the steeple.

On the northern part of the plot surrounding the edifice, a parish Lutheran centre has opened in 2015.

== Architecture ==
=== Exteriors ===
The church's footprint has a Latin cross shape, with one arm of the transept shortened compared to the original design. The outer form of the building presents neo-Gothic style: this type of single-tower brick church was known in the second half of the 19th century as the German type, combining simplicity with an impression of monumentality. The church has a medieval character, with buttresses, gables and grand windows, decorated with tracery, characteristic of English Gothic architecture. This influence in Pomerania can be explained by the wide distribution, from the middle of the 18th century, of English textbooks and architectural templates, which were by then perfectly known by 19th century Prussian architects.

In 1945, Jan Kossowski supervised the repair works and designed a low gable roof topped by a decorative turret to crown the squat tower. The upper tower's façades display tall lanceolate openings with bell round holes in their upper part. The nave, chancel and arms of the transept are covered with separate roofs. The main entrance is designed as a triangular portal with a mosaic depicting the Good Shepherd, placed in a rosette. Lateral and chancel walls are divided by stepped buttresses and pierced by large windows segmented in five split openings.

=== Interiors ===
The interior houses a single-space wide nave with a large wooden barrel vault, enclosed by a wooden matroneum. Patches of the rich painting decor have survived on the walls, unfortunately repainted and partially plastered. Balustrades and matroneum are covered with polychrome floral and geometric motifs. In the chancel stands a brick altar designed by Heinrich Seeling, with an openwork clearance. Above the latter stand a stained glass portraying Jesus and the Four Evangelists, along with a monumental hanging chandelier. Interiors were renovated in 1946-1947.

The organ has been designed by Wilhelm Sauer's company in Frankfurt an der Oder in 1897, as a pneumatic instrument with 25 stops. In 1941, the instrument was rebuilt by Josef Goebel's firm in Gdańsk.It remains slightly unchanged since then: in 2014, an overall renovation was performed. Thanks to its good acoustics, the temple is regularly used for choir performances.

== Gallery ==
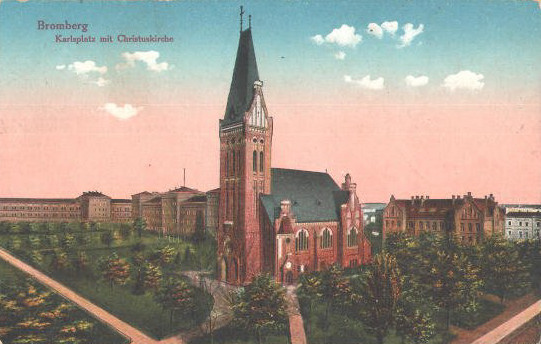
View of the church in 1918

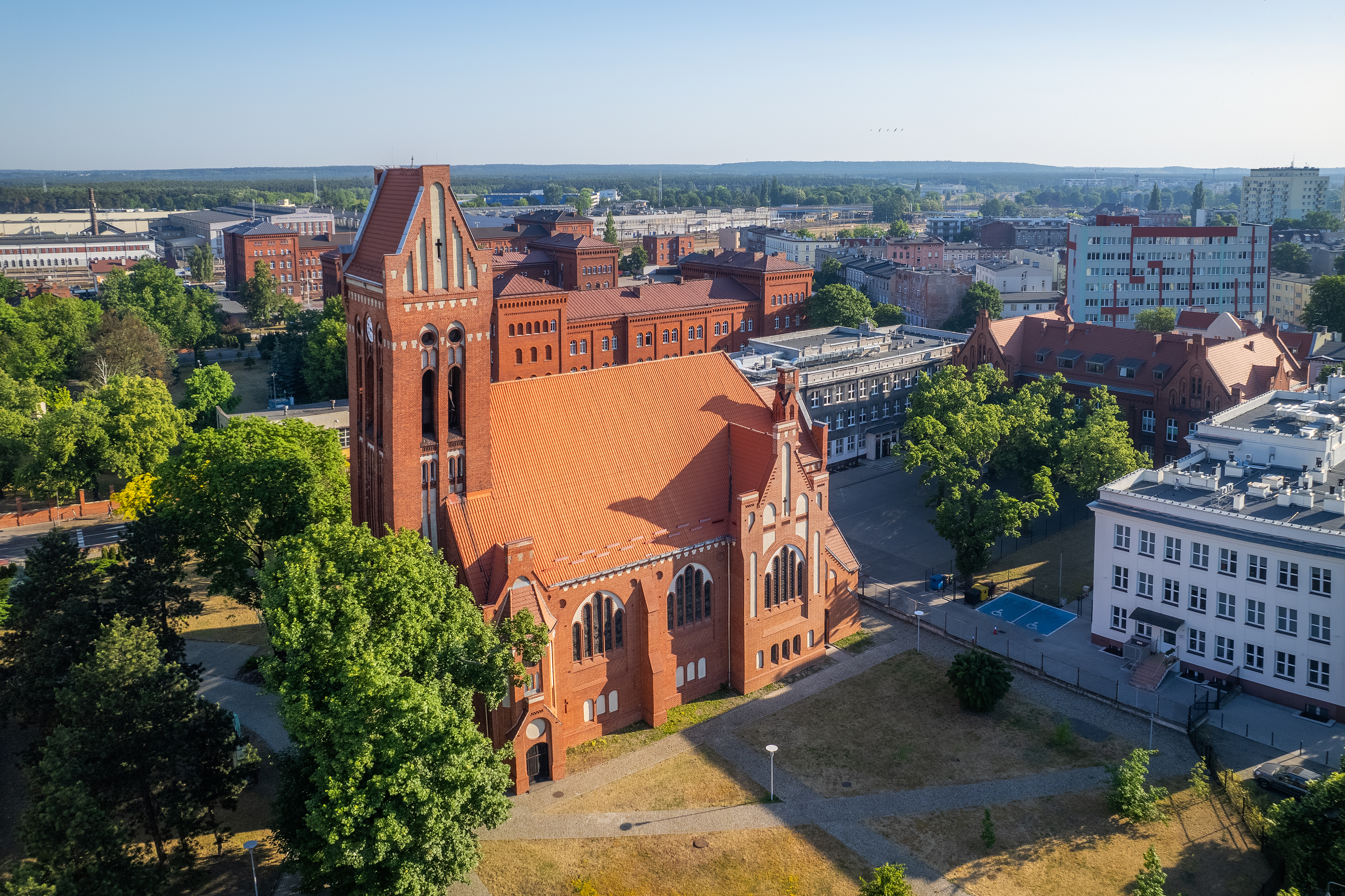
Bird's-eye view of the church and square

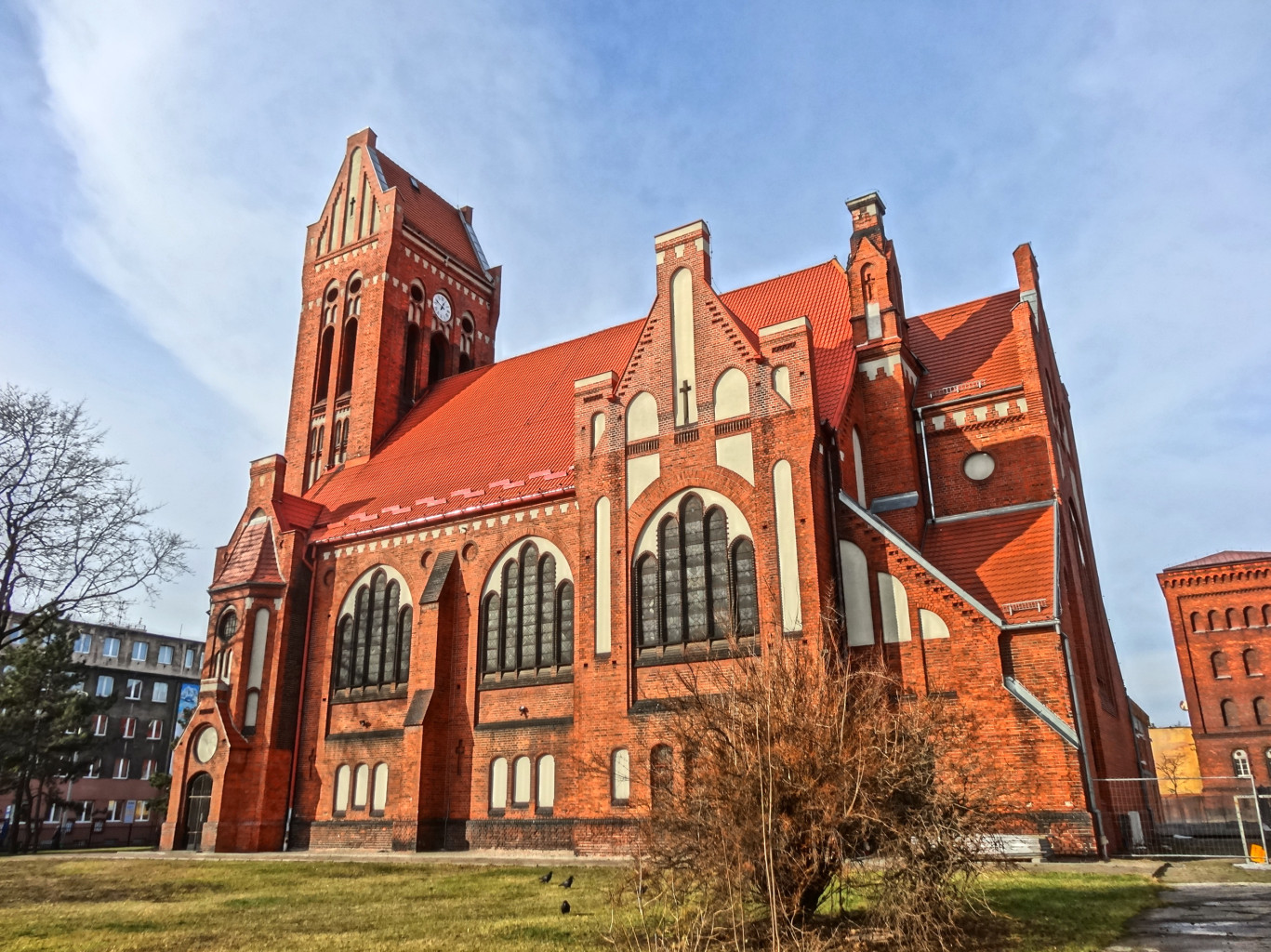
The Church seen from the square

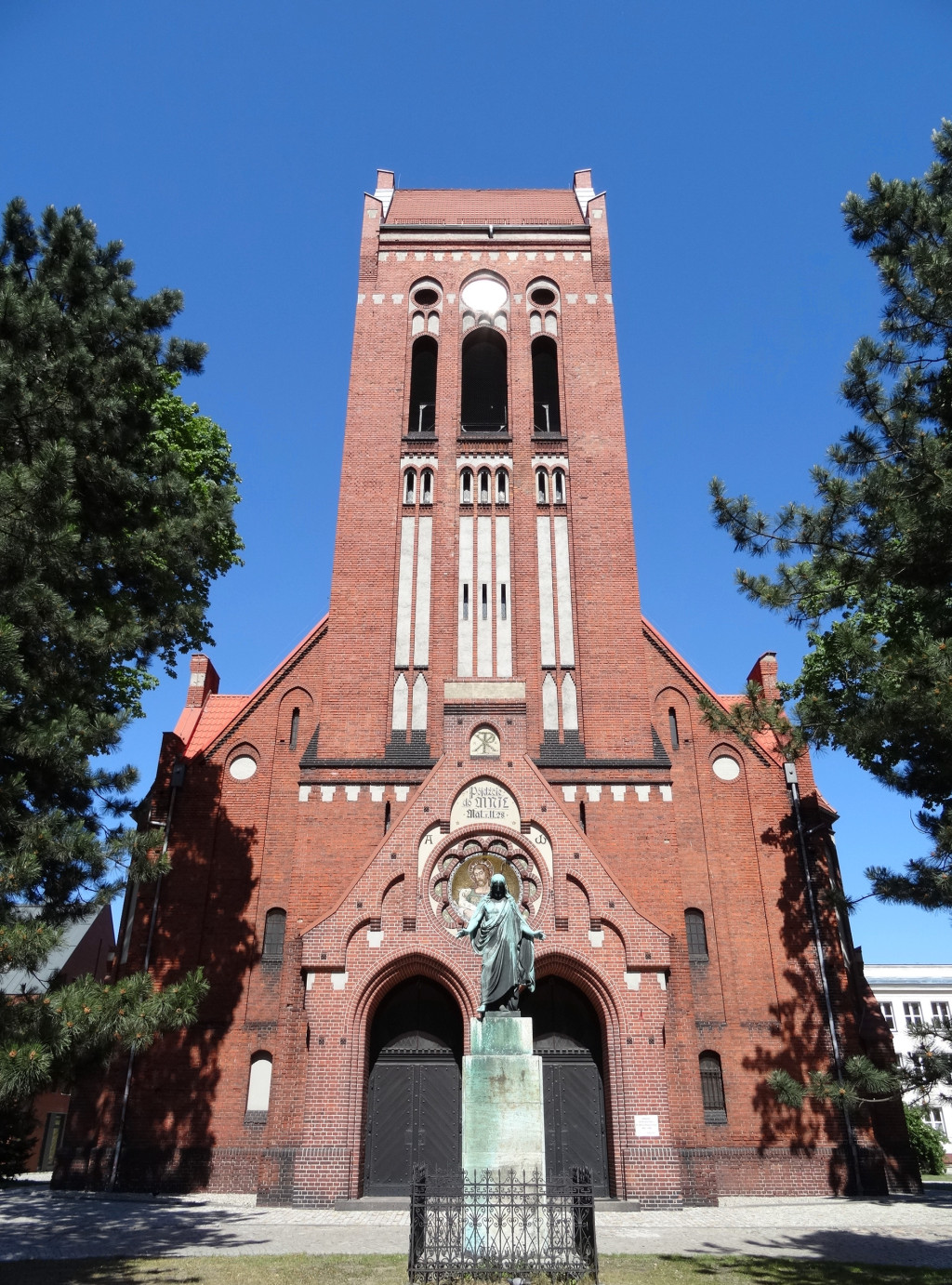
Main elevation

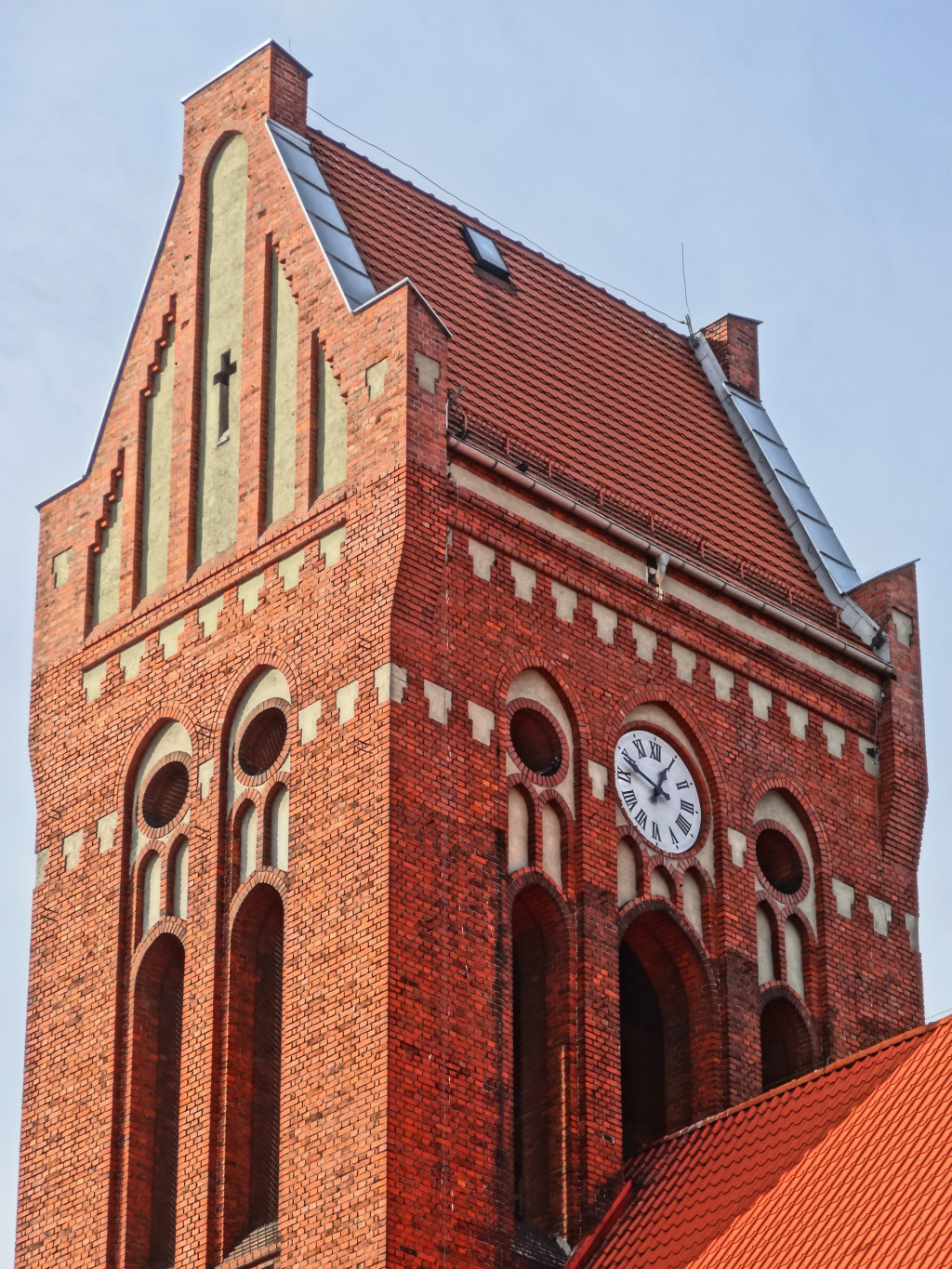
Detail of the tower

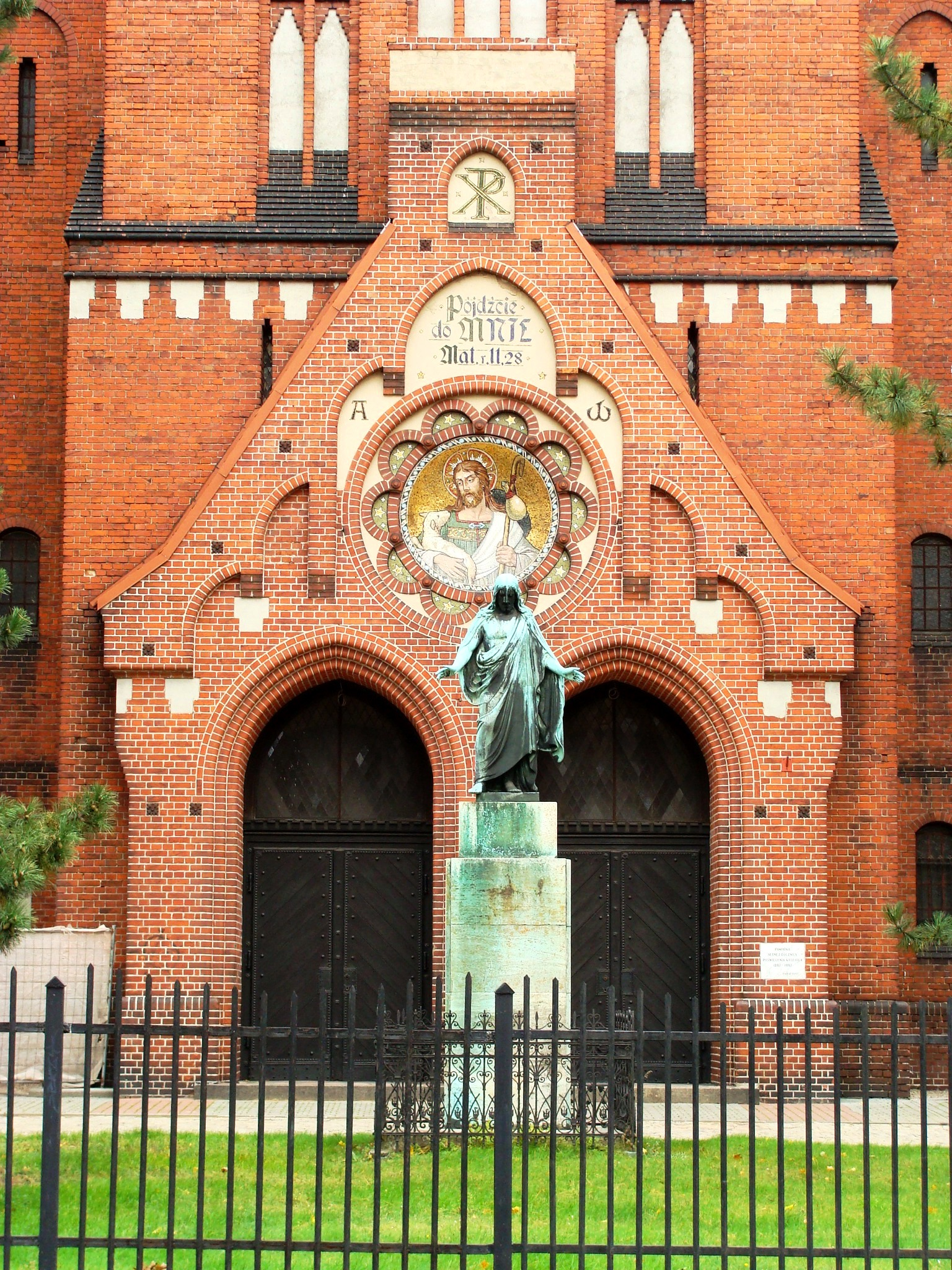
Statue of the Christ with the mosaic in the backdrop

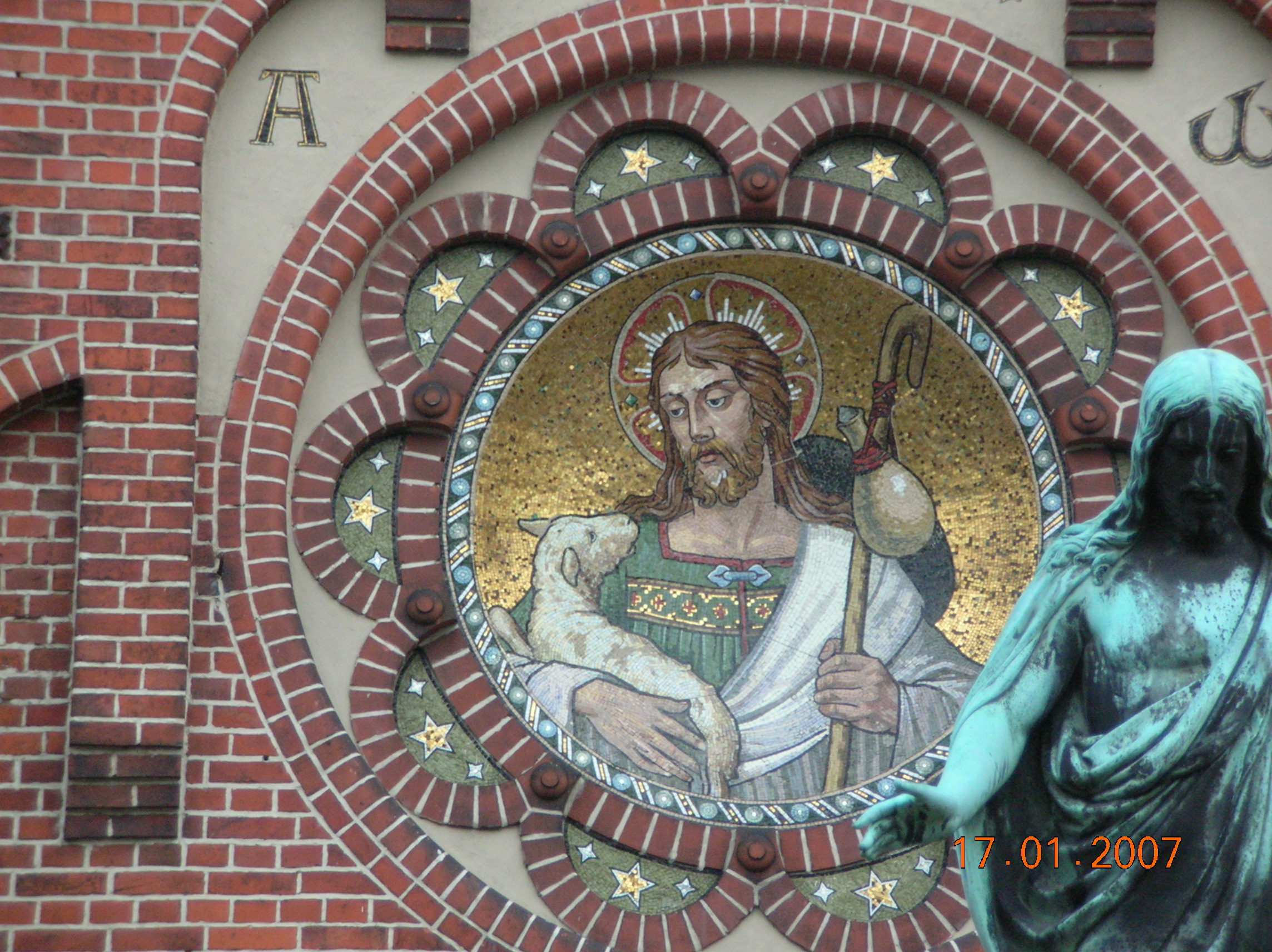
Detail of the mosaic

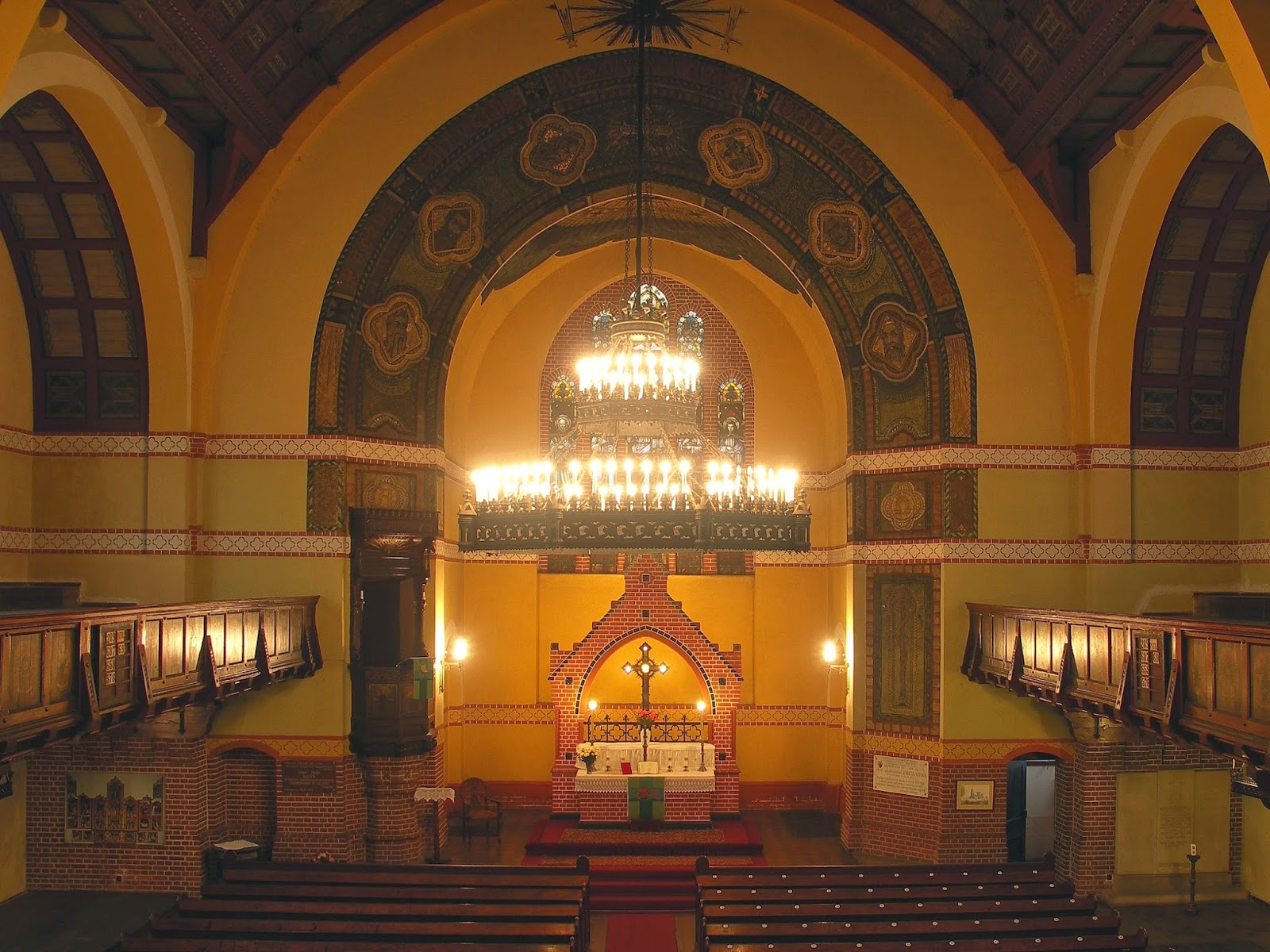
Church altar and chancelier

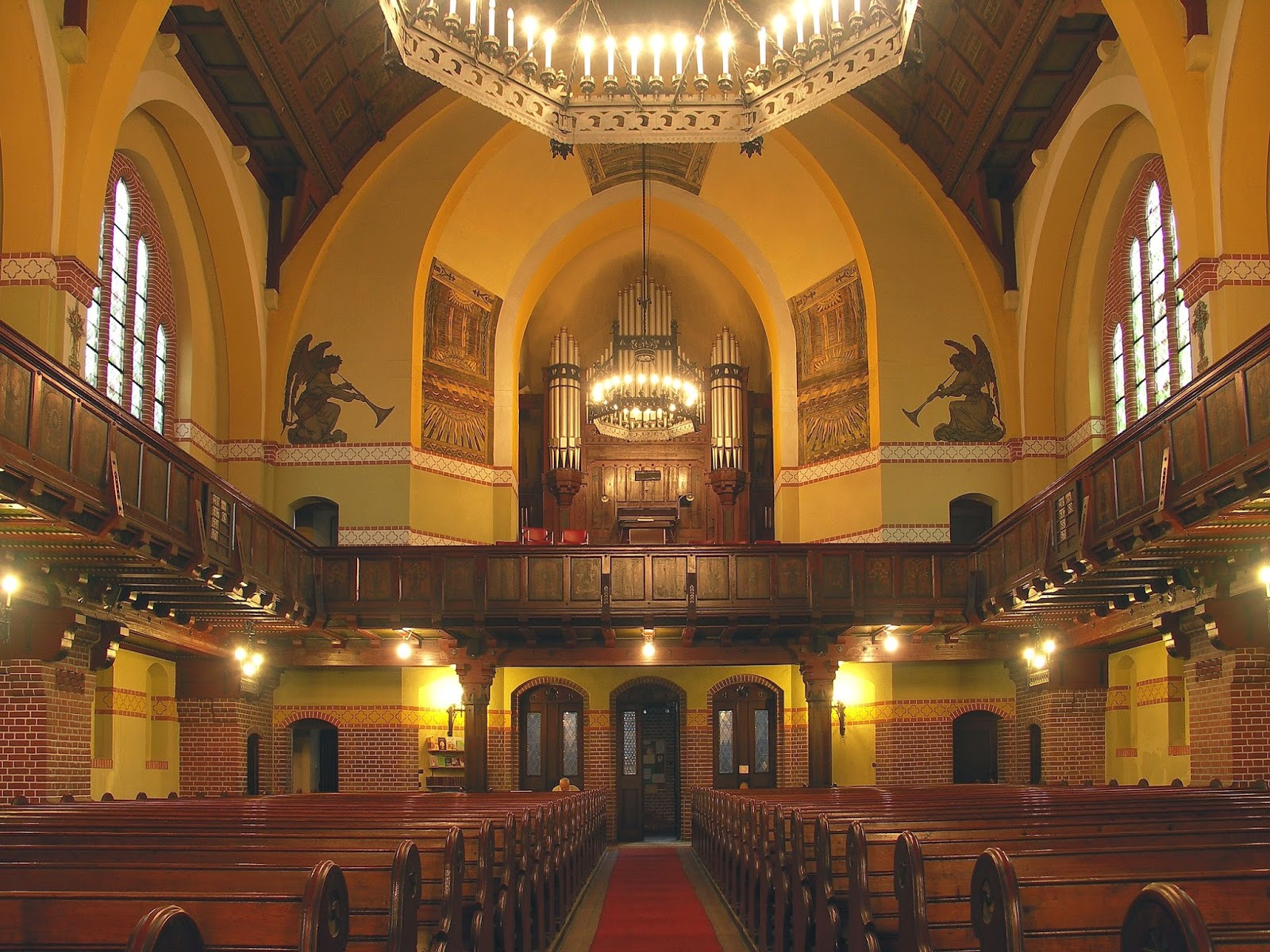
View of the nave and organ

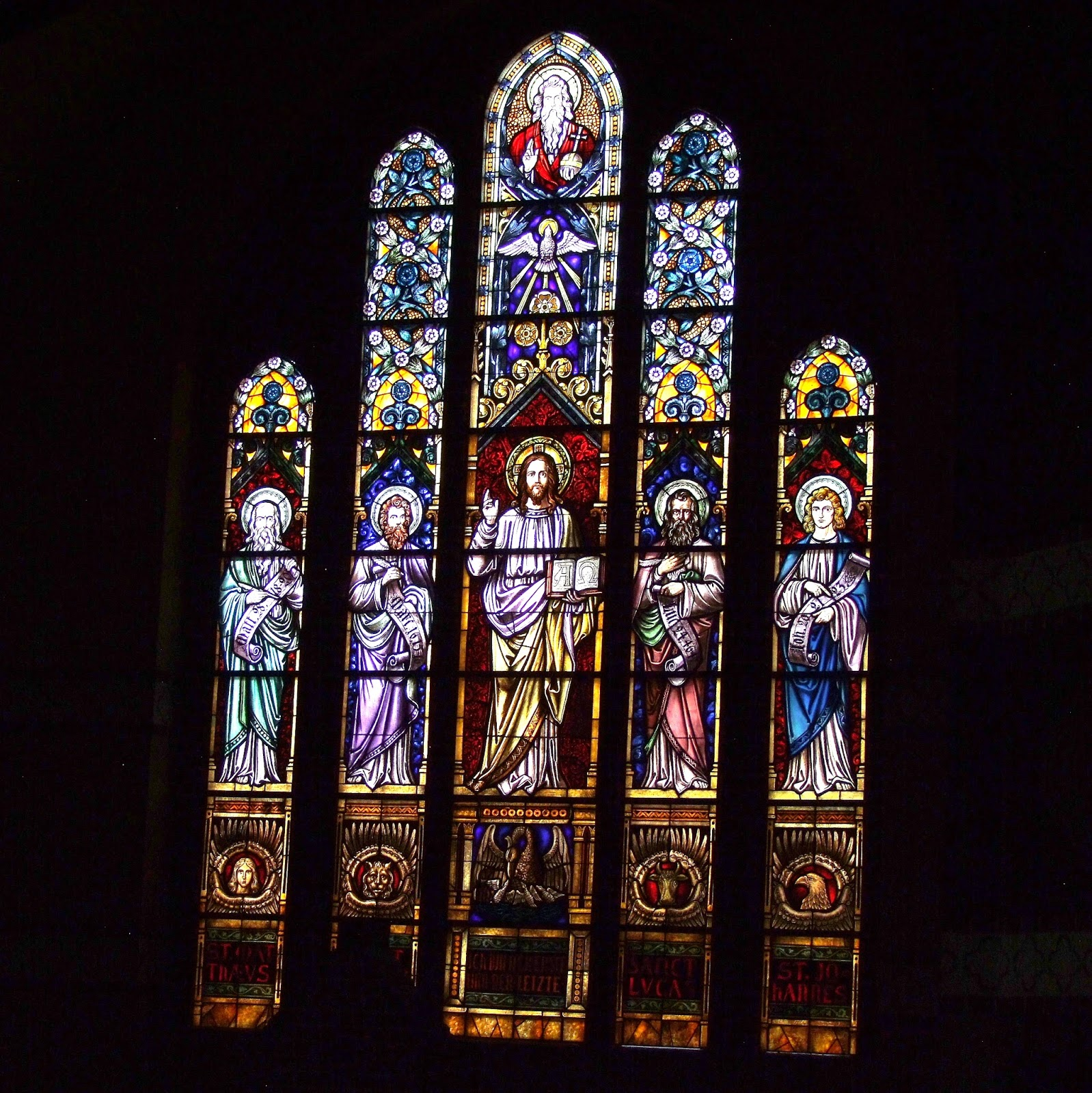
Altar stained glass window

== Bibliography ==
- Kuberska, Inga (1998). Architektura sakralna Bydgoszczy w okresie historyzmu. Materiały do dziejów kultury i sztuki Bydgoszczy i regionu. Zeszyt 3 (in Polish). Bydgoszcz: Pracownia dokumentacji i popularyzacji zabytków wojewódzkiego ośrodka kultury w Bydgoszczy.
- Parucka, Krystyna (2008). Zabytki Bydgoszczy – minikatalog (in Polish). Bydgoszcz: „Tifen” Krystyna Parucka.
- Rogalski, Bogumił (1991). Architektura sakralna Bydgoszczy dawniej i dziś. Kronika Bydgoska XII (in Polish). Bydgoszcz: Towarzystwo Miłosnikow Miasta Bydgoszczy - Bydgoskie Towarzystwo Naukowe. pp. 51–77.
- Bręczewska-Kulesza, Daria (1999). Bydgoskie realizacje Heinricha Seelinga. Materiały do dziejów kultury i sztuki Bydgoszczy i regionu: zeszyt 4 (in Polish). Bydgoszcz: Pracownia dokumentacji i popularyzacji zabytków wojewódzkiego ośrodka kultury w Bydgoszczy.
