= Heinrich Seeling =

German architect (1852–1932)

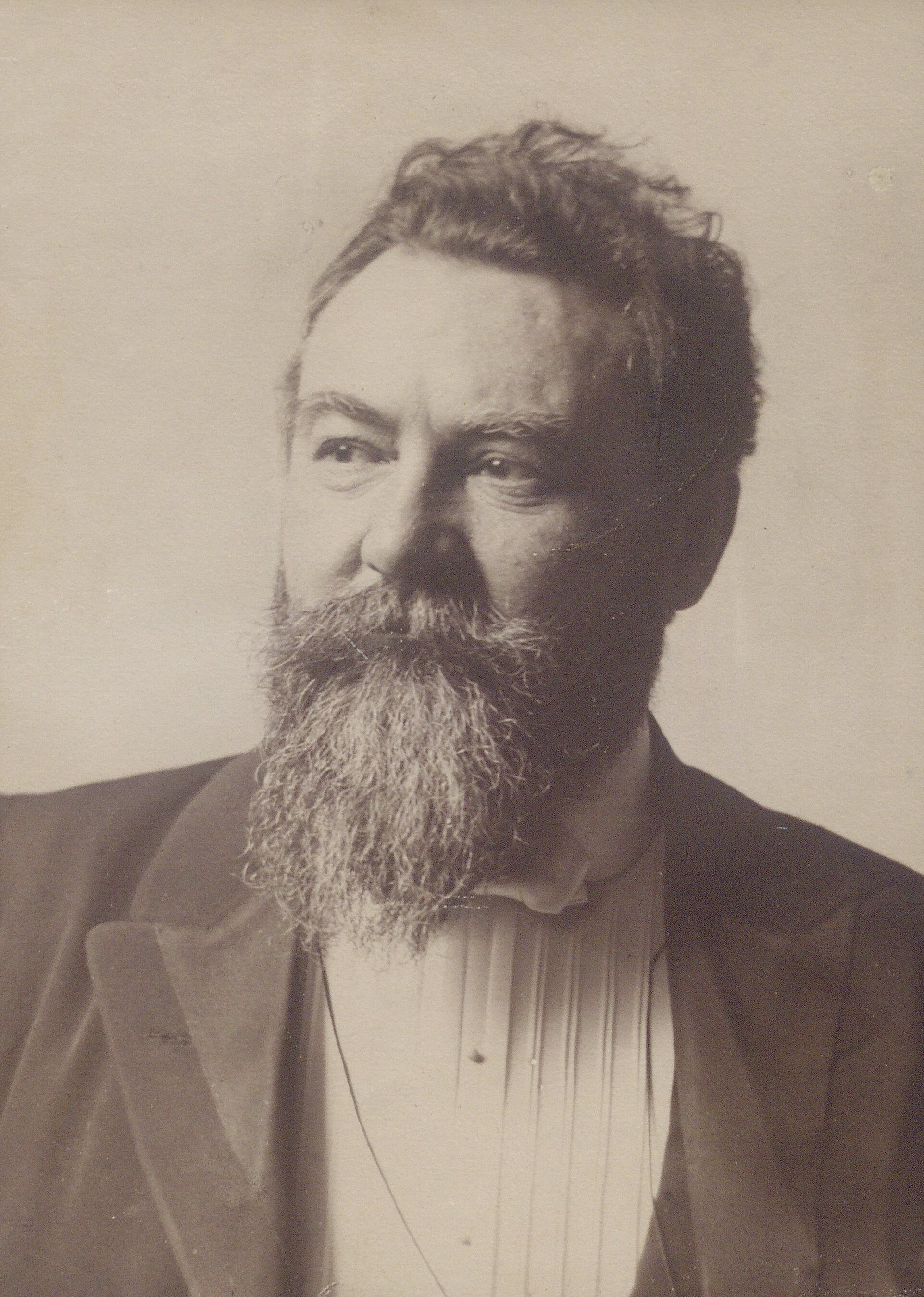
- Born: 1 October 1852; Zeulenroda, Reuss Elder Line
- Died: 15 February 1932 (aged 79); Berlin, Germany
- Occupation: Architect
- Buildings: Deutsche Oper; Theater am Schiffbauerdamm, Berlin
- Projects: Conversion of Theater Aachen

Heinrich Seeling (October 1, 1852 – February 15, 1932) was a German architect.

== Life ==
He was born the son of a bricklayer in the Thuringian town of Zeulenroda, then part of the sovereign Principality of Reuss within the German Confederation. He received further academic training upon his apprenticeship at the college for civil engineering in Holzminden in the Duchy of Brunswick. He studied at the Prussian Bauakademie in Berlin, which was the capital of the German Empire since 1871.

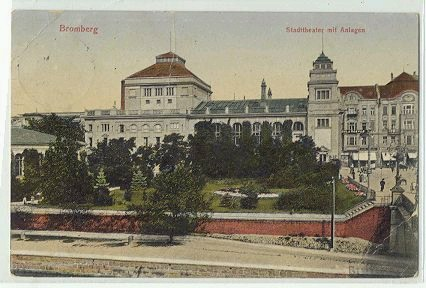
Stadttheater Bromberg, 1909

After studies in Vienna and Italy, Seeling began his career working as an assistant in the studios of Hugo Licht, Hermann Ende and Wilhelm Böckmann in Berlin. In 1882/83 he unsuccessfully competed with Paul Wallot in an architectural contest to erect the new Reichstag building. Nevertheless, he soon acquired renown as an architect of numerous lavish theatre buildings throughout Germany, starting with the construction of the Stadttheater Halle in 1886. He also designed two Protestant churches and several residential and commercial buildings in Bromberg in the Prussian Province of Posen, today Bydgoszcz in Poland.

In 1907 he was appointed director of the building authority in the then independent city of Charlottenburg (incorporated into Berlin in 1920), where he designed the Deutsches Opernhaus, as well as several municipal buildings together with his co-worker Richard Ermisch. Since 1896, Seeling was a member of the Prussian Academy of Arts.

== Work ==
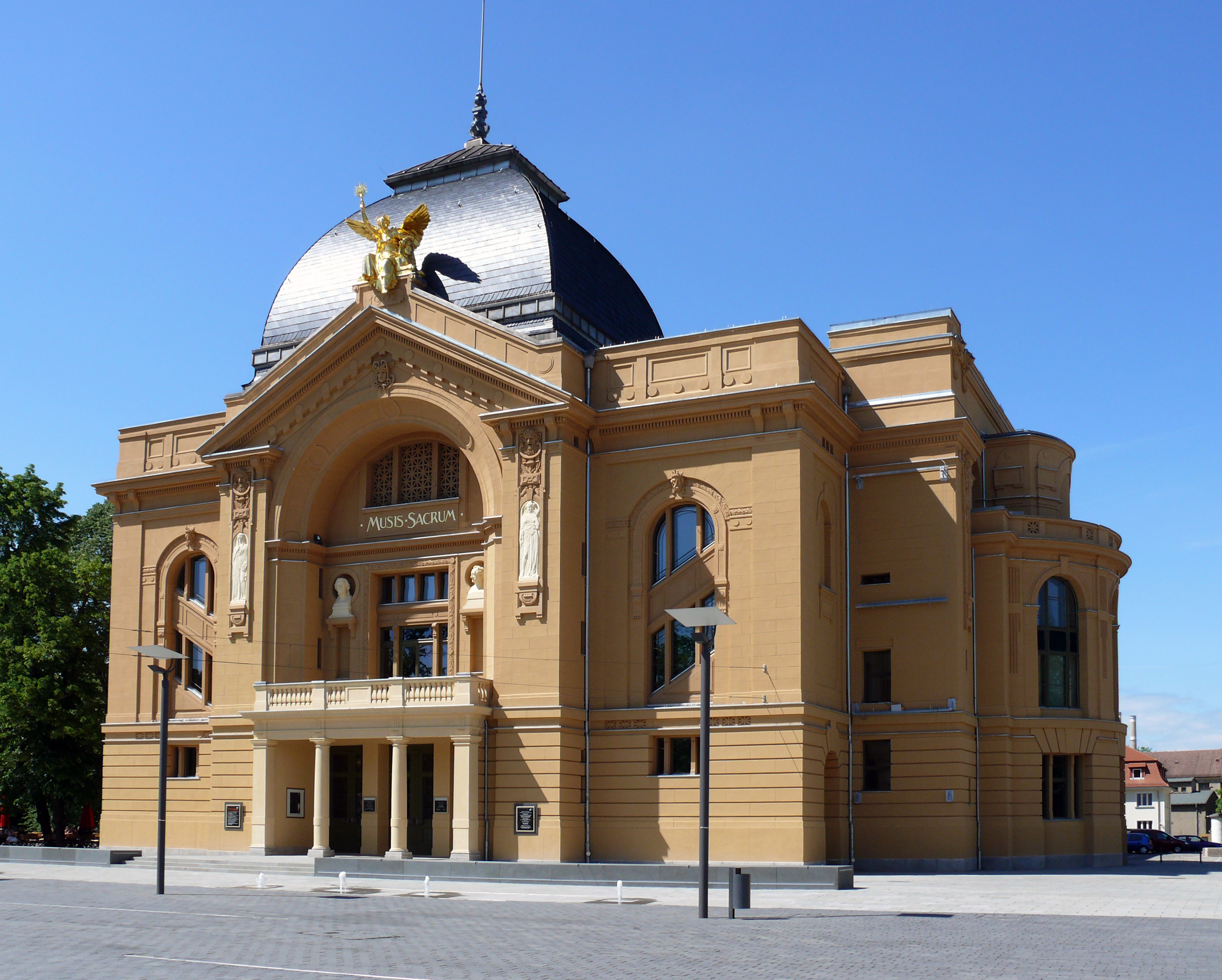
Theater Gera

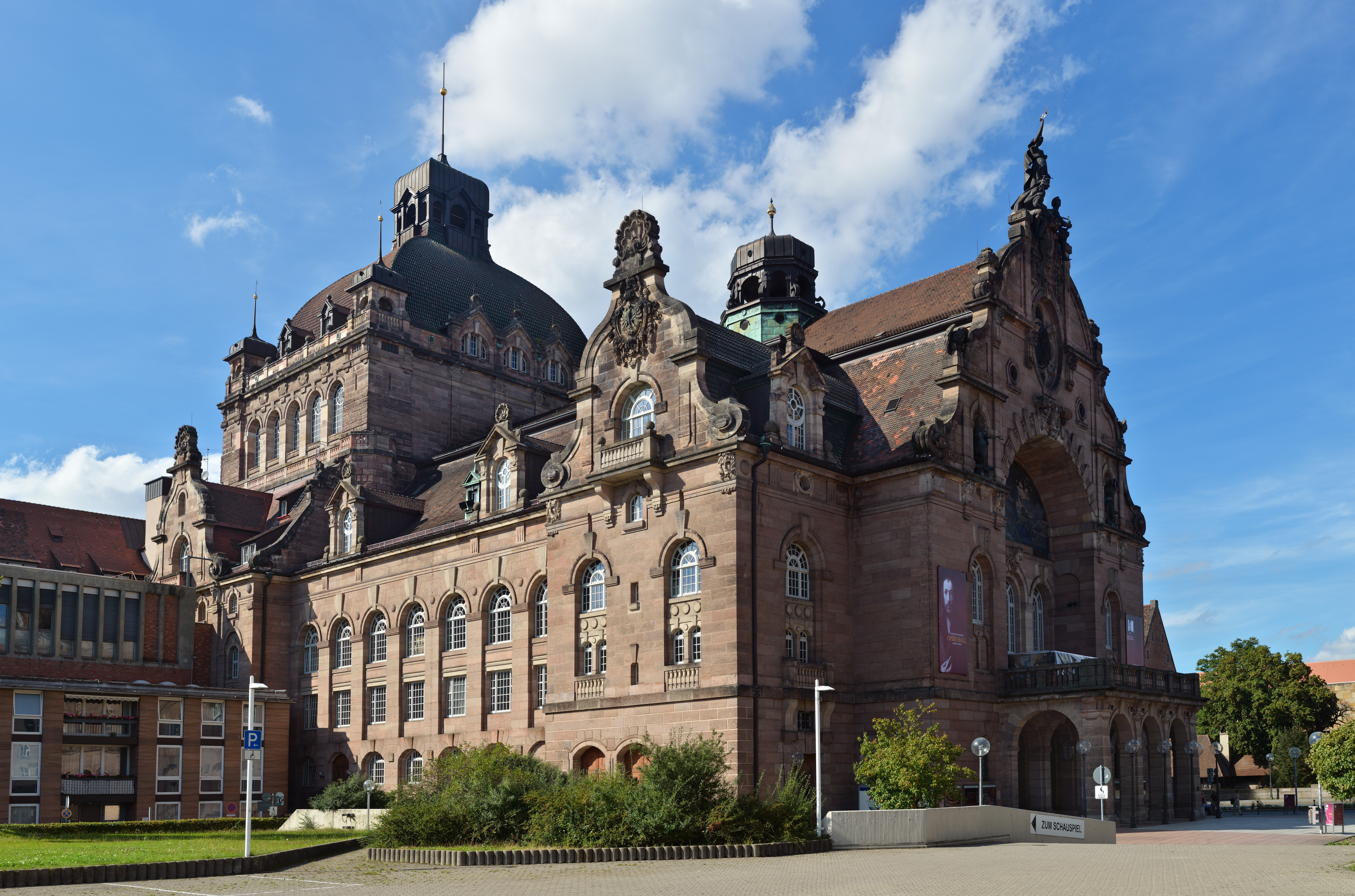
Staatstheater Nürnberg

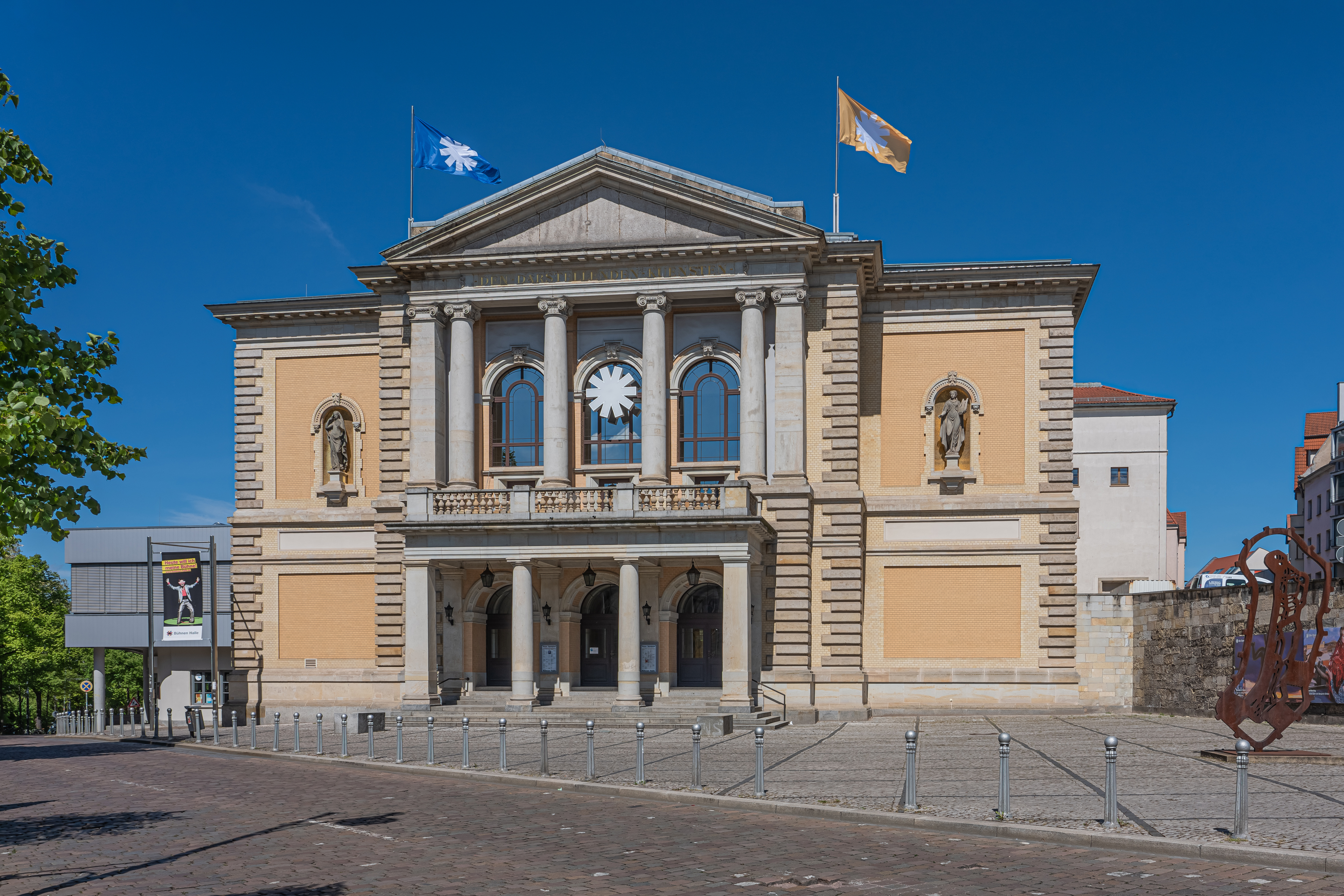
Stadttheater Halle

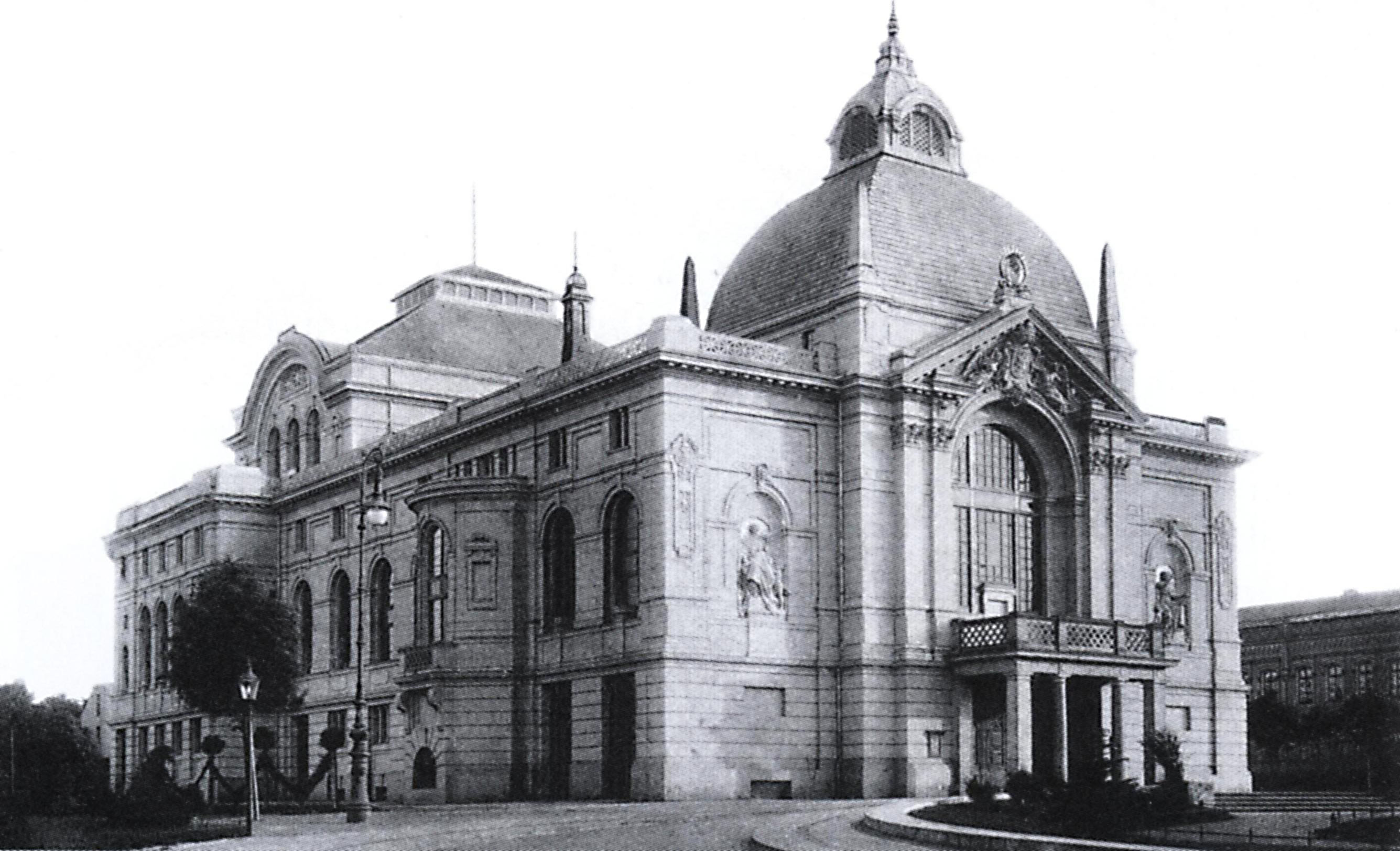
Stadttheater Rostock

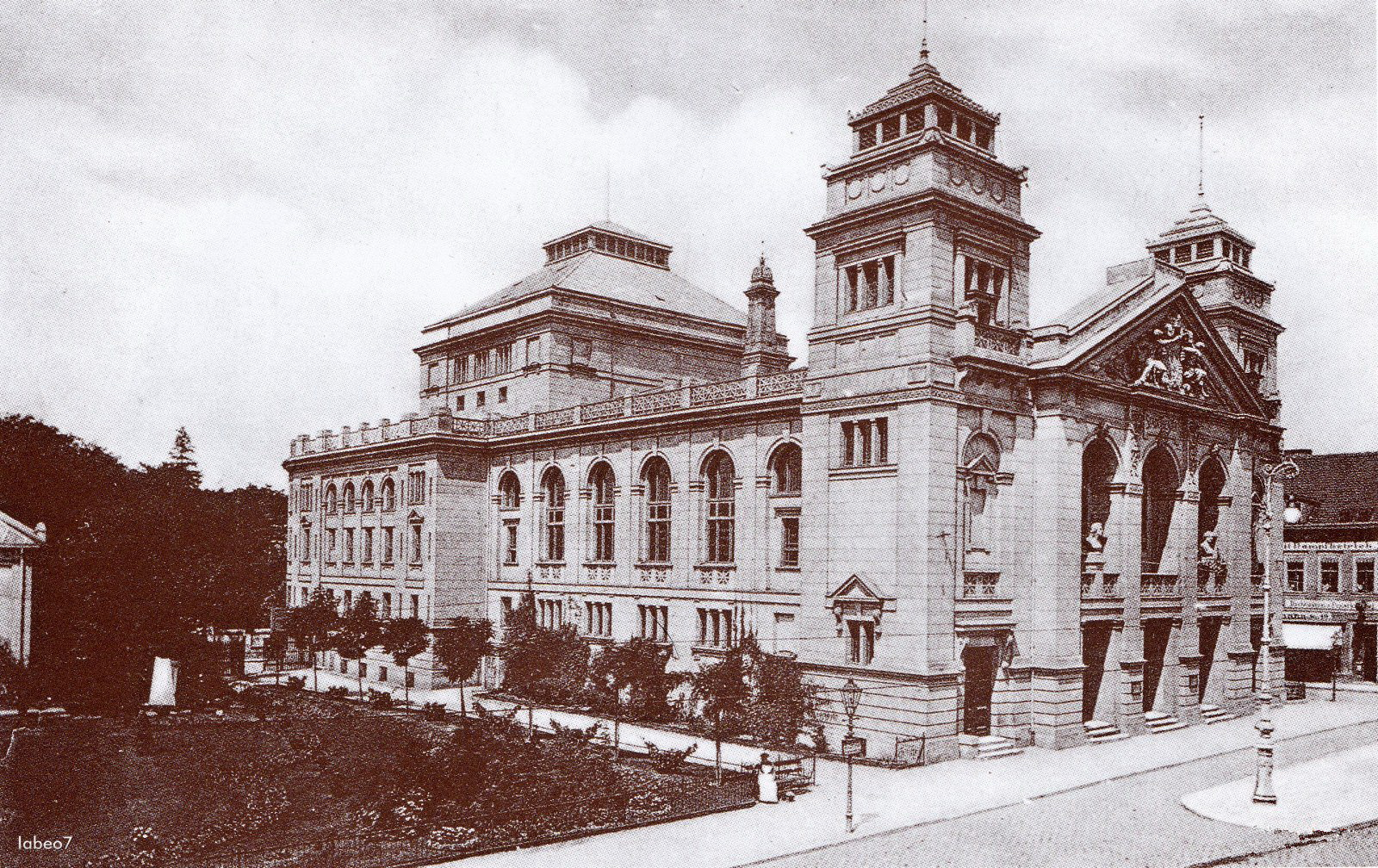
Theater Bromberg

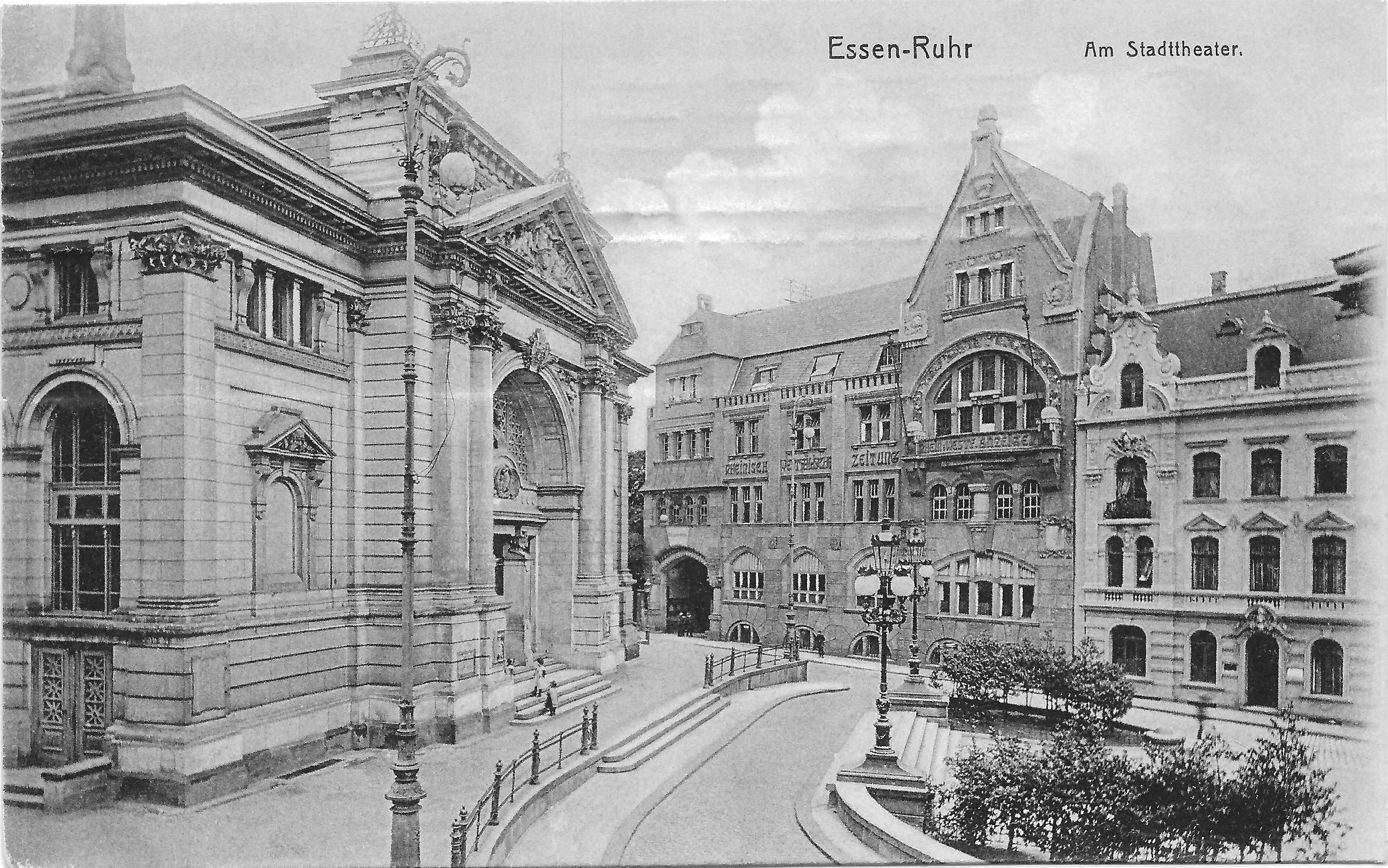
Grillo-Theater (left)

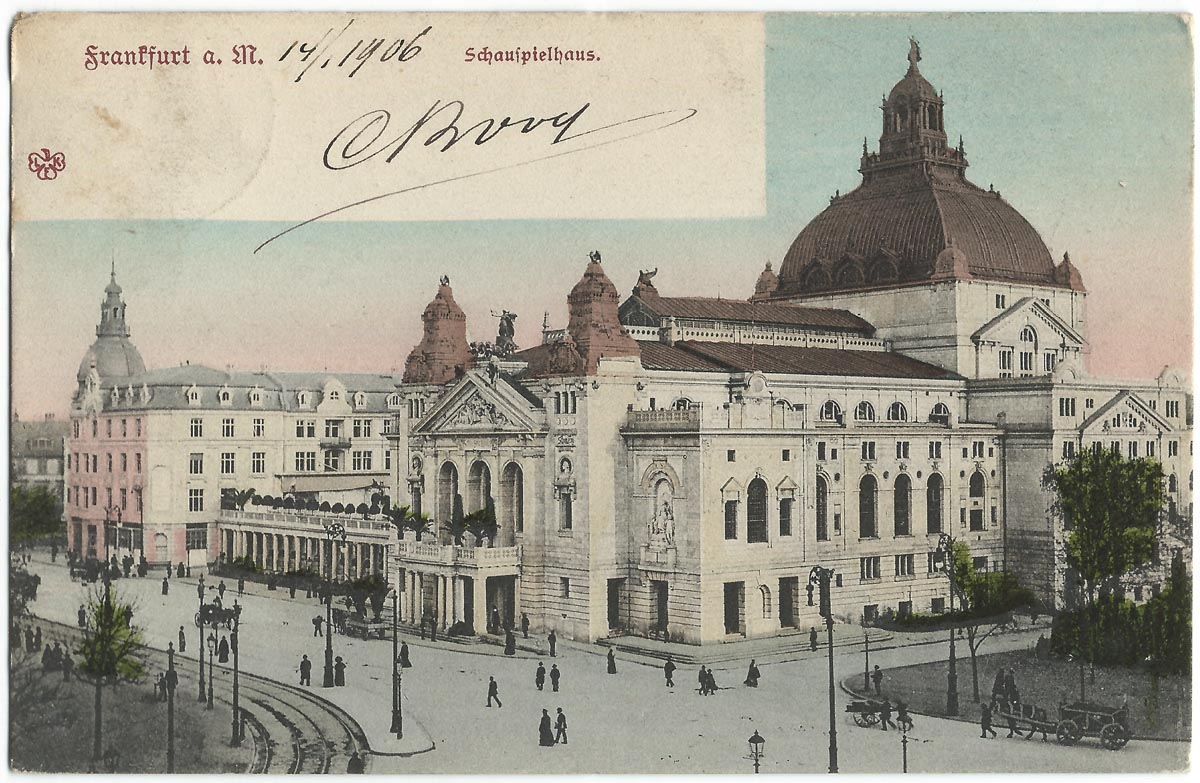
Schauspielhaus Frankfurt

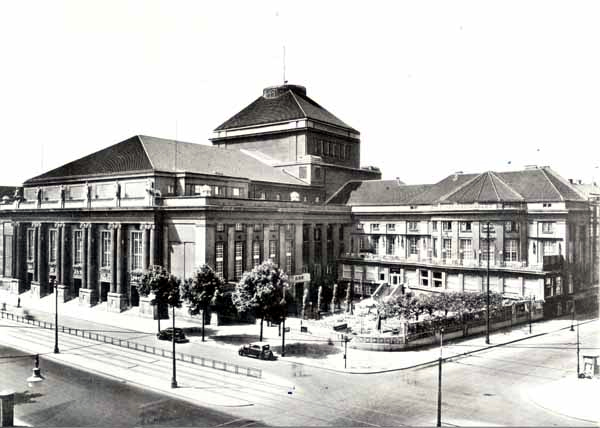
Deutsche Oper

Many of Seeling's buildings were destroyed by strategic bombing during World War II, though some were rebuilt either in a Modern style, in a simplified style or in the original style:

- 1880 Rathaus Calau
- 1886 Stadttheater Halle
- 1892 Theater am Schiffbauerdamm, Berlin
- 1892 Grillo-Theater, Essen (destroyed during World War II)
- 1895 Stadttheater Rostock (destroyed during World War II)
- 1896 Theater Bromberg (from 1919 Teatr Miejski, Bydgoszcz, destroyed during World War II)
- 1897 Christuskirche, Bromberg (present-day Kościół Zbawiciela, Bydgoszcz)
- 1901 Theater Aachen, conversion
- 1902 Schauspielhaus Frankfurt (destroyed during World War II)
- 1902 Theater Gera
- 1903 Evangelische Kirche, Bromberg (present-day Kościół św. Andrzeja Boboli, Bydgoszcz)
- 1905 Staatstheater Nürnberg, then the most expensive theatre construction in Europe
- 1907 Kiel Opera House
- 1910 Theater Freiburg
- 1910 Rathaus Charlottenburg, extension
- 1912 Deutsche Oper, Charlottenburg (destroyed during World War II)
- 1914 Waldhaus Charlottenburg, Kremmen

== Death ==
Heinrich Seeling died on the 15th of February, 1932 in Berlin.
