= Jan Kossowski =

Polish architect

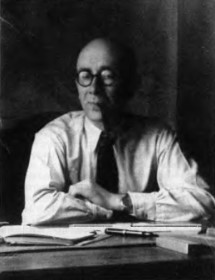
- Picture of Jan Kossowski in the 1930s
- Born: 13 July 1898; Khrenovka, Russian Empire
- Died: 9 December 1958 (aged 60); Bydgoszcz, Poland
- Occupation: architect
- Spouse: Pelagia Brzezińska
- Children: Jerzy (b. 1928), Danuta (b. 1929), Andrzej (b. 1945)
- Parent(s): Karolina née Kostenecka and Jan Kossowski

Jan Kossowski (1898-1958) was a Polish architect and builder, mainly associated with Bydgoszcz. His professional activity spanned from the interwar period to the 1940s. His artistic style is mainly connected with Modern Architecture.

== Life ==
Jan Kossowski was born in the estate of Khrenovka, near Mogilyov-Podolskiy in the Podolia region on 13 July 1898. The Kossowski family had his roots in the voivodeship of Lublin; Franciszek the ancestor was the first Kossowski of the line in the 15th century. His mother Karolina died when he was 11 years old in 1909 and his father Jan died in 1917. The young Jan graduated from Mogilyov primary school and from Vinnytsia junior school. He then started learning in Odessa.

On 27 April 1917 he volunteered for the Polish I Corps in Russia commanded by the general Józef Dowbor-Muśnicki: injured in June 1918, he was sent home to his family estate. After working two years as an accountant in a sugar refinery in Stepanovka, near Vinnytsia, he joined anew the Polish army in 1920, and participated to the Battle of Warsaw for which he was decorated.

Still serving in different army units, lived in 1921 in Poznań, in 1922–1923, in Toruń and in May 1923, he moved to Bydgoszcz to be employed as a building draftsman for the District Engineering Management (Polish: Kierownictwo Rejonu Inżynierii i Saperów). Jan Kossowski asked to be transferred from Toruń to Bydgoszcz so as to start learning at the State School of Art Industry. Released from army service at the end of 1923, he was employed on 1 November 1924 by the architect and engineer Bronisław Jankowski, first as a construction technician, and then from 1928 onwards as the head of Bronisław's office at Dworcowa Street 62, since Bronisław Jankowski moved at the time to Gdynia to co-manage another construction company. From 1925 to 1928, he designed and realized for Jankowski 's firm residential villas on the thriving Sielanka district. 1933 brought many changes in Kossowski's life: in June, he married Pelagia Brzezińska from Bydgoszcz, but the same year Bronisław Jankowski closed his Bydgoszcz office in 1933, following the economic aftermath of the Great Depression, and Kossowski's cooperation with the company ended. Jan then set up his own architectural studio in Bydgoszcz, at 6 Chwytowo street, which he moved in 1937 to 24 Kordeckiego street, where he also lived with his family.

Leading his own company, the 1930s were the most prolific period for Kossowski's professional activity. During these times, he designed over 30 tenement houses and villas in downtown district, mainly in the Sielanka and Leśne areas. Some of these buildings stand in Gdańska Street, Wolności Square or Swiętej Trojcy street.

On 23 August 1939 he was enlisted to the army, and was captured on 17 September but managed to escape and returned to Bydgoszcz in mid-November. Demobilized, he initially found a job in a water and sewage installation company owned by engineer Józef Piecek, and subsequently worked in the office of architect Karl Schaum from April 1940 to May 1943: during this period, he supervised the construction of arcades at the ground floor of opposite tenements at 2 Jagiellońska street in Bydgoszcz and 2 Focha street. Later, he worked at the Municipal Construction Office (1943-1945).

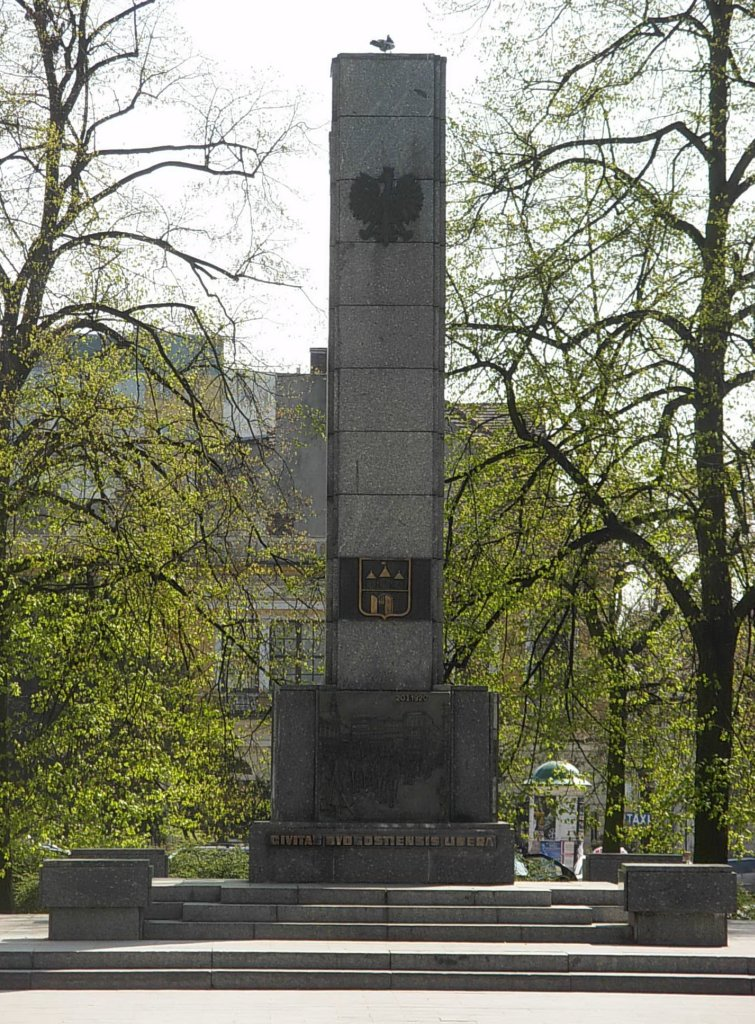
Monument on Plac Wolności, 1945

After the liberation, he was appointed by Polish municipal authorities in January 1945, as the head of the Urban Planning and Development Department and as the city architect. Jan Kossowski maintained for a while his second job in his own architectural office now located at 22 Jagiellońska street, but in 1948, he switched to a full-time position to the benefit of the city affairs in the Central Office of Studies and Projects of Industrial Construction. Many constructions in Bydgoszcz date back to this period, in particular in Gdańska Street, Słowackiego Street, 3 May street or Theatre square. For the latter, Kossowski even drafted the project of a new building to replace the former Municipal Theatre razed in 1945. In June 1953, he submitted a design for the philharmonic building; though not endorsed by the selection committee, his concept was pretty close to Stefan Klajbor's one realized in 1954–1958.

Jan Kossowski died on 9 December 1958. He was buried in Bydgoszcz, at the Cmentarz Nowofarny.

== Activity ==
First part of Kossowski's activity extends till 1933: it regards works performed jointly with Bronisław Jankowski. These projects are mainly villas, which shapes refer to manor houses with picturesque contours, including porches supported by columns.

In 1933, he directed the project aiming at expanding the Regional hospital for children at 44 Chodkiewicza Street.

Kossowski's independent realizations (from 1933 onward) are inspired by International style, using expressionist elements composed of simple solids. Subsequent projects, built after the Great Depression, are characterized by richer forms, with more expensive linings and a closer attention to details. In his way, he transplanted the idea of functionalism and Le Corbusier's ideas to Bydgoszcz.

After a visit he made in Gdynia 's buildings, the architect took a liking to construct more elevated edifices, often located a street corners, like the ones at 5 Swiętej Trojcy, 22/24 Markwarta or 21 Piotrowskiego, displaying four-story houses with rounded shapes and windows circulating smoothly across the entire elevation like ribbons. Jan Kossowski also designed and built in 1939 a tenement house with a car showroom at 7 Plac Wolności.

His best appraised villas designed stand in the Sielanka and Leśne areas and at Sułkowskiego street in Bydgoszcz. They were also inspired by his studies made during visiting Gdynia.

Jan Kossowski additionally designed public buildings (reconstruction), industrial buildings, sacral buildings. In 1945, he supervised the repair works of the damaged roof tower of the Church of the Savior. That same year, he designed the Freedom Monument (Polish: Pomnik Wolności), erected at Plac Wolności.

== Instances of works in Bydgoszcz ==
Main preserved buildings by Jan Kossowski in Bydgoszcz
Year	Edifice	Remarks	Picture
1928	Tenement at 3 Słowackiego street	The tenement was built at the beginning of the 20th century; its first owner was the architect Paul Böhm. Jan Kossowski redesigned the interiors in 1928.	
1933	Pałac Ślubów at 8a Sielanka Street	Initially commissioned by merchant Czesław Borys.	
1934	Villa at 6 Asnyka street, corner with Ossoliński Alley	One of the houses part of the Sielanka area project in the 1930s.	
1933-1938	22/24 Markwarta Street	Located at the corner of Markwarta and Piotrowskiego streets.	
1934-1937	5/5a Swiętej Trojcy street	The tenement has been built on the premises formerly occupied by an iron foundry factory established in 1846.	
1935	Villa at 5 Ossoliński Alley	The house has been designed for Mr L. Stojowski.	
1936	Tenement at 41 20 Stycznia 1920 Street	One of the first tenement realized by the architect. Investor was Emil Franke, a director of a sugar factory	
1936	Hotel "Pod Orlem" at 14 Gdańska Street	Jan Kossowski worked in refurbishing the interiors of the hotel.	
1936	Emil Bernhardt tenement at 16 Gdańska Street	Works of interior renovation.	
1936-1937	Tenement at 17 Jana Zamoyskiego	Renting building commissioned by Bernard Cisewski	
1936-1938	208-220 Gdańska Street	Jan Kossowski designed plots 208 to 214 (1936-1938). He cooperated with other architects (J. Trojanski, T. Krieger, M. Zablonski) for buildings 216 to 220.	
1937	Tenement house	Located at 9 20 Stycznia 1920 Street	
1938	House at 11 Markwarta Street	Villa commissioned by Wilhelm Millner.	
1938	House at 117 Jagiellońska street	Part of the workshop complex Pasamon	
1938	Tenement at 11 Gdańska Street	Works of interior renovation.	
1938	Tenement at 12 Gdańska Street	Works of interior refurbishing for a workshop.	
1939	Tenement at 7 Plac Wolności	The facade is clad with sandstone, and the glazed ground floor was originally occupied by a Chevrolet car dealer, Antoni Butowski.	
1939	Tenement at 3 Piastowski Square	Jan Kossowski rebuilt there a 19th-century tenement.	
1939	Tenement at 4 Jagiellońska street	The architect expanded the original building from the end of the 19th century, with enlarged wings and outbuildings, so as to create a single, closed bank complex.	
1940	Ground floor arcades (additions)	Tenements at 6 Theatre square and 2 Focha street.	
1946	Drukarnia shopping mall at 1 Jagiellońska street	Kossowski designed a major expansion of the Printing Plant Institute (Polish: Zakłady Graficzne Instytutu Wydawniczego) that then stood on the premises.	
1946	Bydgoszcz University building at 11 Jagiellońska street in Bydgoszcz	Reconstruction.	
1946-1948	Gasworks building at 42 Jagiellońska street	Reconstruction and expansion of the administrative building.	
1947	Mix Ernst tenement at 10 Gdańska Street	Kossowski supervised renovation works to fit a local agency of the State Agricultural Bank (Polish: Państwowy Bank Rolny).	
1949	Reconstruction of the presbytery and the chapel of Our Lady of Czestochowa, St. Vincent de Paul Basilica Minor	The basilica, located at 2 Ossoliński Alley, has been completed in 1945.	

== See also ==
- Bydgoszcz
- Bydgoszcz Architects (1850-1970s)
- List of Polish people

== Bibliography ==
- Wysocka, Agnieszka (2003). Działalność architektoniczna Jana Kossowskiego w Bydgoszczy w latach 1923-1939. Materiały do dziejów kultury i sztuki Bydgoszczy i regionu. Zeszyt 8 (in Polish). Bydgoszcz: Pracownia Dokumentacji i Popularyzacji Zabytków Wojewódzkiego Ośrodka Kultury w Bydgoszczy. pp. 79–98.
