= Carl Mayer (disambiguation) =

Carl Mayer (1894–1944) was a German screenplay writer.

Carl Mayer may also refer to:

- Carl J. Mayer (born 1959), American lawyer, politician, author, public speaker and consumer advocate
- Carl Mayer von Rothschild (1788–1855), German banker

== See also ==
- Karl Mayer, a character on Desperate Housewives
- Carl Meyer (disambiguation)
- Karl Meyer (disambiguation)
