= Walter Myers =

Walter Myers may refer to:

- Walter Dean Myers (1937–2014), African American author of young adult literature
- Walter Kendall Myers (1937–2026), spy for Cuba who worked for the United States State Department
- Walter Myers (physician) (1872–1901), British physician, toxicologist and parasitologist
- Walter Myers Jr. (1914–1967), justice of the Indiana Supreme Court

== See also ==
- Walter Mayer (disambiguation)
