= Karl Meyer =

Karl Meyer may refer to:

- Karl Meyer (activist) (born 1937), American pacifist, activist, Catholic worker and tax resister
- Karl Meyer (aviator) (1894–1917), World War I flying ace
- Karl Meyer (biochemist) (1899–1990), German biochemist
- Karl Meyer (businessman) (1888–1971), Norwegian businessman, stockbroker and fascist
- Karl E. Meyer (1937–2019), American journalist
- Karl Friedrich Meyer (1884–1974), Swiss-born American pathologist
- Karl Meyer-class seaplane tender, a Second World War-era ship
- Karl Meyer (footballer) (born 1894), Swiss national team footballer

== See also ==
- Karl Mayer (character), a fictional character on the U.S. TV series Desperate Housewives
- Karl Mayer (poet) (1786–1870), German poet
- Carl Meyer (disambiguation)
- Carl Mayer (disambiguation)
- Karl Maier (disambiguation)
