= Pasamon, Bydgoszcz =

Passementerie company, 1921, Bydgoszcz, Poland

Coordinates: 53°07′19″N 18°01′59″E

Pasamon Sp. z o.o.
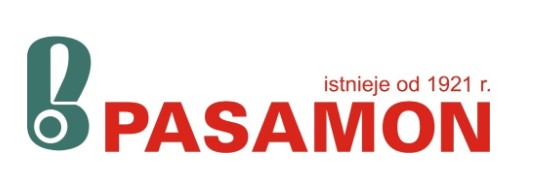
- 100th anniversary Pasamon logo

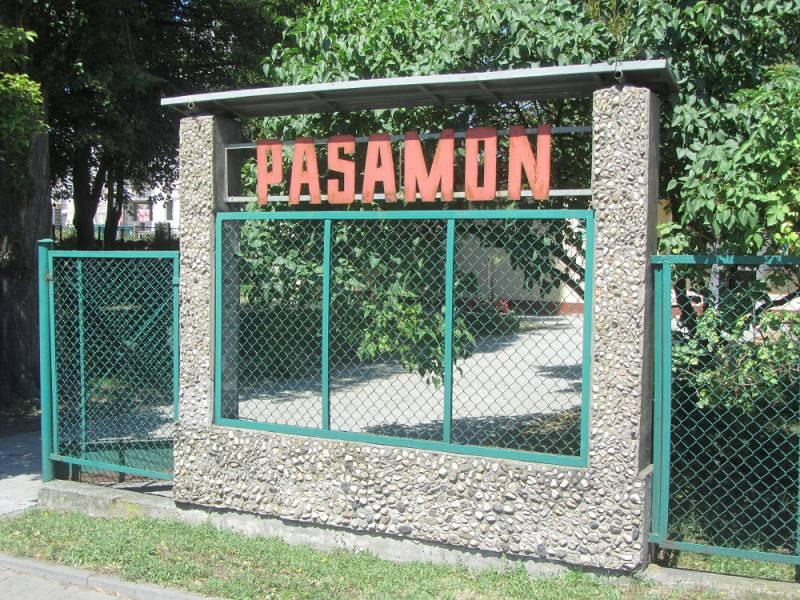
- Pasamon main entrance
- Type: Firm
- Industry: Textile industry
- Founded: 1921 in Bydgoszcz, Poland
- Founder: Eligjusz Franciszek Lewandowski
- Headquarters: 117 Jagiellońska Street, Bydgoszcz, Poland
- Website: www.pasamon.com.pl

Pasamon ("Pasamon" Sp. Zo.o.) is a textile industry company in Bydgoszcz. It was established in 1921 by entreprneur Eligiusz Franciszek Lewandowski. The firm gradually expanded its offer, from a traditional haberdashery, to woven fabric tapes and technical products, used in various domains (mining, transport, construction or military equipment).

== History ==
In 1827, Isidor Sandmann, a Jewish haberdasher from Susz, settled in Bydgoszcz and set up in 1854, a haberdashery factory at present day Długa street. In the early 1870s, he bought a plot at Poznańska street and moved his plant there. In 1900, Sandmann moved the factory to 3 Krasińskiego street and its operation was taken over by his son Martin, who was also a haberdasher. Isidor died on December 17, 1901, in Bydgoszcz.

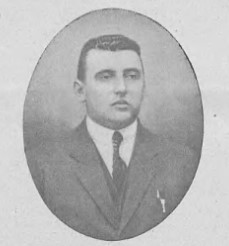
E.F. Lewandowski ca 1923

=== Interwar ===
In 1922, Janiak and Lewandowski, two entrepreneurs from Bydgoszcz, bought companies from the hands of Jewish citizens, so as to transformed them into a commercial business, Janiak-Lewandowski. The purchase included the Fabryka Wyrobów Drzewnych (English: Wood items factory) in Dworcowa Street and the Fabryka Pasmanterii "Pasamon" (English: Haberdashery factory "Pasamon") at 4 Theatre Square.

In 1924, Eligiusz Franciszek Lewandowski (1883-1935) became the sole owner of the plant, as his partner Janiak, co-owner of the Fabryka Wyrobów Drzewnych had been living in Pleszew. He started the construction of new facilities at the eastern part of today's Jagiellońska street, then called Promenada street, and purchased as well new machines. In the 1920s, workforce varied between 50 and 75 people, while during the Great Depression, the production was limited.

In the 1930s, a weaving mill was built, together with a villa dedicated to the plant's owner in 1938, on designs by architect Jan Kossowski. In July 1933, Lewandowski opened a company store in Poznań. He died two years later, on November 29, 1935.

At the eve of World War II, Fabryka Pasmanterii, Taśm i Pasów „Pasamon” E. F. Lewandowskiego (English: E. F. Lewandowski's Factory of haberdashery, ribbons and belts "Pasamon") employed 700 people and manufactured various items, from technical tapes for the army and railways to transmission belts, webbing belts, filter belts, fabrics and light haberdashery. It was a leader on its market during interwar Poland.

=== German Occupation ===
During the occupation, the facility moved under the "German Central Trust Office-East" (German: Haupttreuhandstelle Ost), dealing with the issues related to the disposition of property in the Polish annexed lands. In 1942, Adolf Schramm was named as manager of the facility.

The production was adapted to war effort needs, manufacturing tapes for rifles, uniforms and bandages.

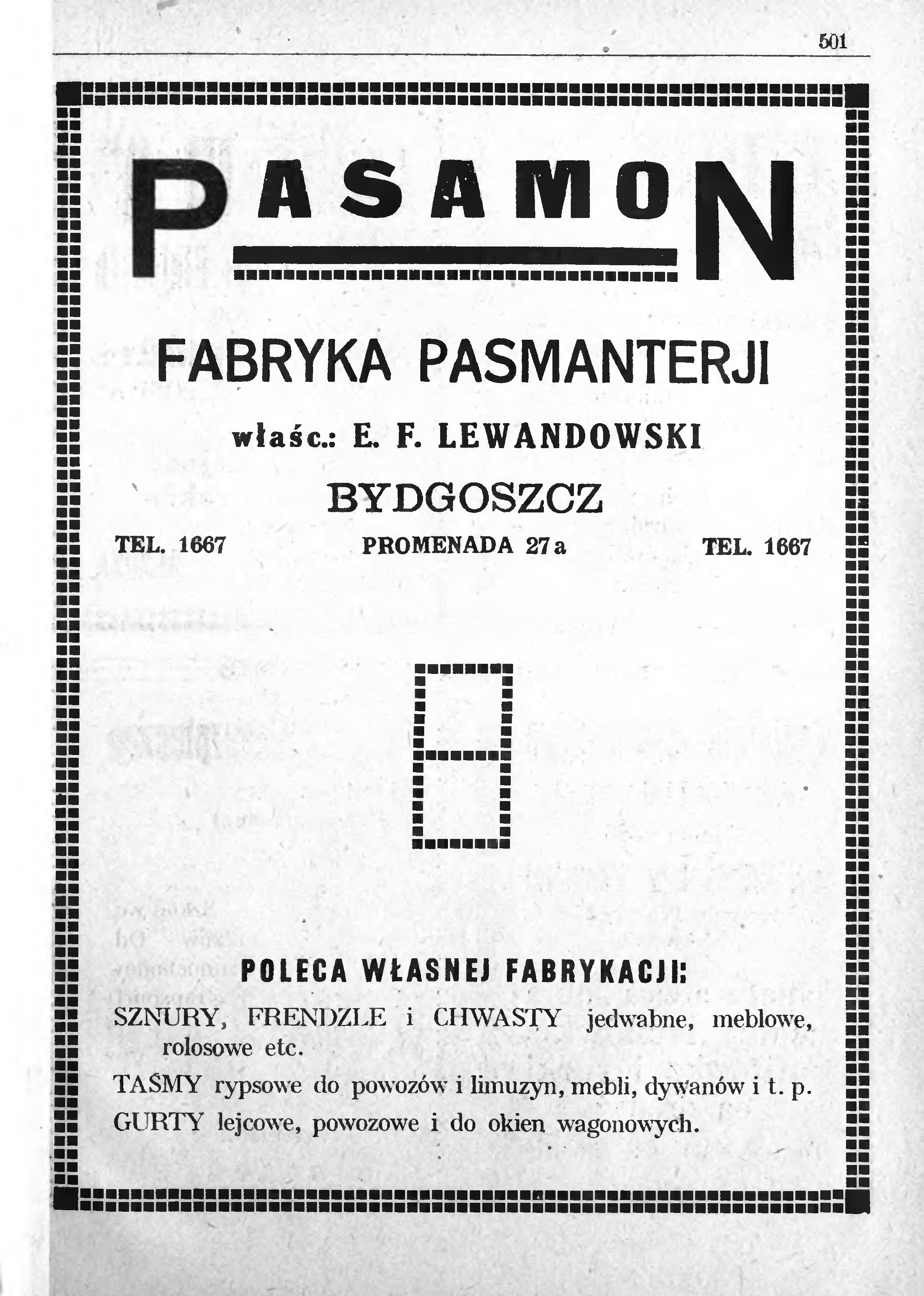
Advertising for Pasamon, 1929

=== PRL Period (1946–1989) ===
In 1945, the factory was nationalized and expanded in the following years with, among others, a second weaving mill, warehouses, workshops, a dye house and a lodge.

The machinery was modernized with up-to-date looms, dyeing units and binders. Like many industries in this period, "Pasamon" became a multi-site enterprise with branches in Bydgoszcz (at Jagiellońska and Wrocławska streets) and in Włocławek.

In 1954, the company employed 544 people among whom 350 women.

The name was changed to Pomorska Fabryka Taśm i Pasów (English: Pomeranian Factory of Tapes and Belts) and later to Bydgoskie Zakłady Taśm Technicznych "Pasamon" (English: Bydgoszcz Technical Tape plants "Pasamon"). In 1964, a Volunteer Fire Brigade was established on the site.

=== Recent period (since 1989) ===
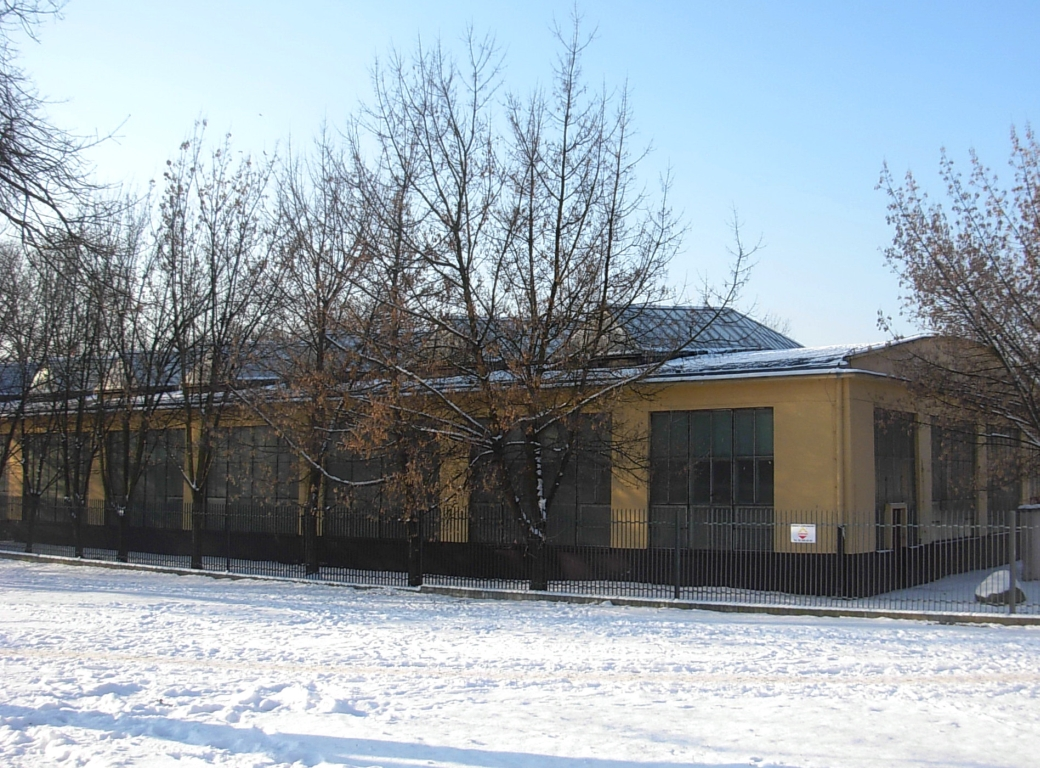
Pasamon production site building

In the early 1990s, the factory branch in Włocławek cut loose its ties with "Pasamon".

In February 1993, a notarial act established a private limited company and in 1997 the capital was shared among the employees. Eventually, in 2007, the "Pasamon" company was privatized.

During the year 2000s, research and development was developed, aiming at implementing new technologies in the production process, such as:

- polyester tapes for slings for cranes;
- flame retardant and heat-shrinkable tapes;
- tapes for military purposes;
- high-strength kevlar tapes;
- antistatic tapes for mining.

Exports have been steadily growing got the "Pasamon", with items sent out mainly in Europe (Great Britain, Germany, Hungary, the Czech Republic, Slovakia, Ukraine, Latvia, Belarus and Lithuania).

== Current characteristics and production ==
Pasamon is a manufacturer of woven fabric tapes and technical haberdashery, used in numerous domains: leather crafting, upholstery, mining, transport, construction, military equipment.

The firm offers a panel of 2500 kinds of tapes, produced in widths from 3 millimetres (0.12 in) to 130 millimetres (5.1 in). Some of the items are realized following special customer orders.

The Bydgoszcz plant has a metrology laboratory used for testing the textiles. It cooperates as well with Polish scientific institutes (e.g. Central Mining Institute in Katowice, Faculty of Polymer and Dye Technology of the Łódź University of Technology).

Since 2004, the company is certified as meeting the ISO 9001 quality management system.

Pasamon has a company shop at 117 Jagiellońska street in Bydgoszcz, collocated with the production site: the location is highlighted with a brand neon sign which has been operating since 1973.

Furthermore, the firm operates offices in Gdynia, Łódź, Poznań, Sosnowiec, Wałbrzych, and Wrocław.

=== Selection of products ===
The selection of products include:

- belts, safety harnesses (parachute), Polish Armed Forces uniforms, and military equipment
- seatbelts
- mining tapes
- sling straps, transport straps, and safety straps
- tapes for upholstery, elastic bands, and trimmings
- carrying straps for bags, backpacks, sports, and tourist equipment
- leashes, riding reins
- lanyards
- special purpose textile tapes

Products are made of cotton, linen, polyester, polyamide and polypropylene.

== See also ==
- Bydgoszcz
- Jan Kossowski

== Bibliography ==
- Dębicki, Zdzisław (23 August 1923). "PASAMON". Tygodnik Illustrowany. N. 35 [Weekly illustrated. N. 35] (in Polish). Warsaw: Gebethner i Wolff.
