= Gasworks building, Bydgoszcz =

Gasworks building in Bydgoszcz
- Polish: Budynek Gazownia w Bydgoszczy
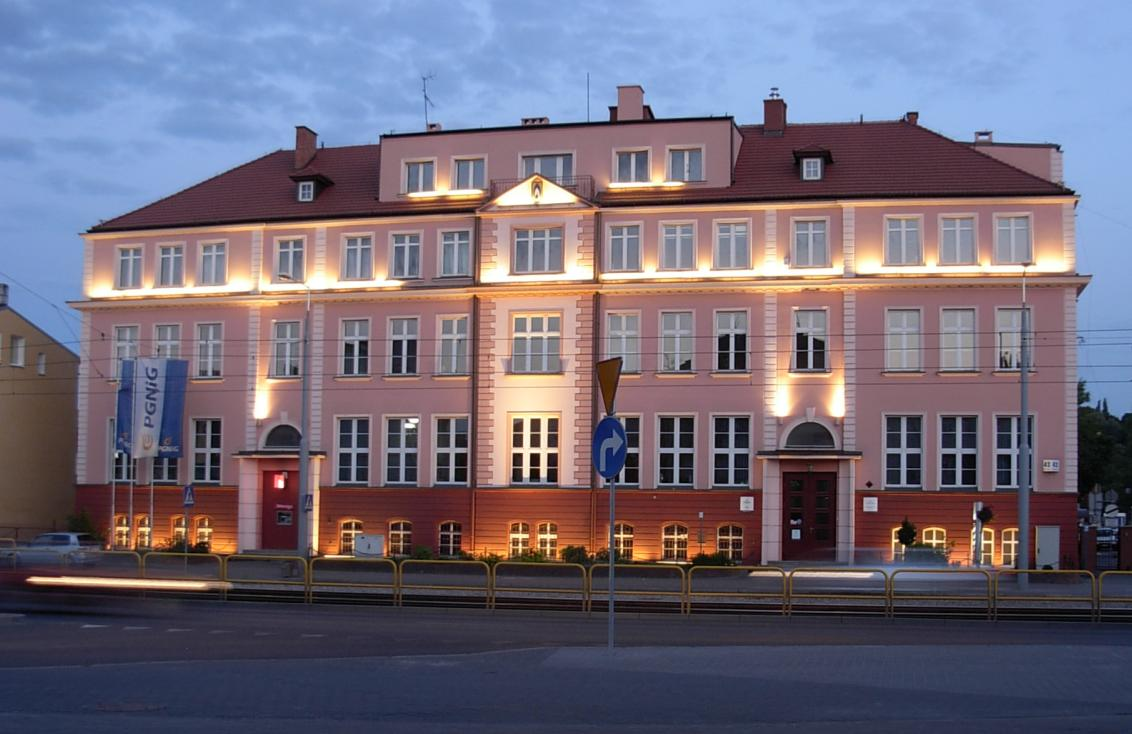
- View from Jagiellońska Street
- Interactive map of the Gasworks building in Bydgoszcz area

General information
- Type: Former Coal gas factory
- Architectural style: Historicism
- Location: 42 Jagiellońska Street, Bydgoszcz, Poland
- Coordinates: 53°7′23″N 18°00′55″E
- Completed: 1859
- Client: Polska Spółka Gazownictwa

Technical details
- Floor count: 3

Design and construction
- Architect: Carl Meyer

Website
- http://www.psgaz.pl/

The Gasworks building, is a historical edifice built between 1859 and 1860 in Bydgoszcz, Poland. It has also been known as the Bydgoszcz District Gas Plant and as Pomeranian Gas Company, Branch Gas Plant of Bydgoszcz. In 2003, it became part of the Polska Spółka Gazownictwa (Pomeranian Gas Company), as a branch called Gas Plant in Bydgoszcz.

== Location ==
The edifice is the administrative seat of Bydgoszcz gasworks offices, settled at 42 Jagiellońska Street. The company still occupies the historical technical and administrative buildings on the current plot.

== History ==
=== Prussian period ===
The Gasworks company of Bydgoszcz is one of the oldest in Poland. The building was built in 1859, on a selected area of the Brda river, and it was placed into active service on 1 October 1860, when the city was part of Prussia. The choice of the location was done so that it was possible to bring coal by waterways from the Vistula River or the Bydgoszcz Canal. The power plant was located on the former eastern outskirts of the city. The gas was produced by the combustion of coal, hence its name coal gas, or "town gas". During the first 20 years of its existence, during which the city became part of the German Empire, the gasworks produced exclusively for street lighting: in 1860, 285 gas lighting appeared in Bydgoszcz city, replacing kerosene lamps, and illuminating most important places (offices, hotels). In 1910, 1488 lamp posts were using "town gas", with an automatic switch-on system running since 1900.

From 1880 on, coal gas has been provided also to households and industry, and in 1909, 10,065 units were already installed.

The gas plant initially covered an area of 0.8 ha. It soon grew up to 7.4 ha after World War I. Production of gas used coal from Upper Silesia and England and to ease transportation, a railway was built in 1890, along today's Oginskiego street, and joining the main network in the vicinity of Artyleryska Street. During the year 1909, 1219 wagons loaded with 17500t of coal entered the gas plant through the railway. In 1881, the first renovation of the gasworks was carried out, as would happen regularly in following years. In 1905, with the construction of five furnaces has been built an administrative building, designed by architect Carl Meyer. In 1908, he created a device for the production of synthetic gas. During the 1920s, without any new investment, the economic crisis pushed the gasworks activity to slow down.

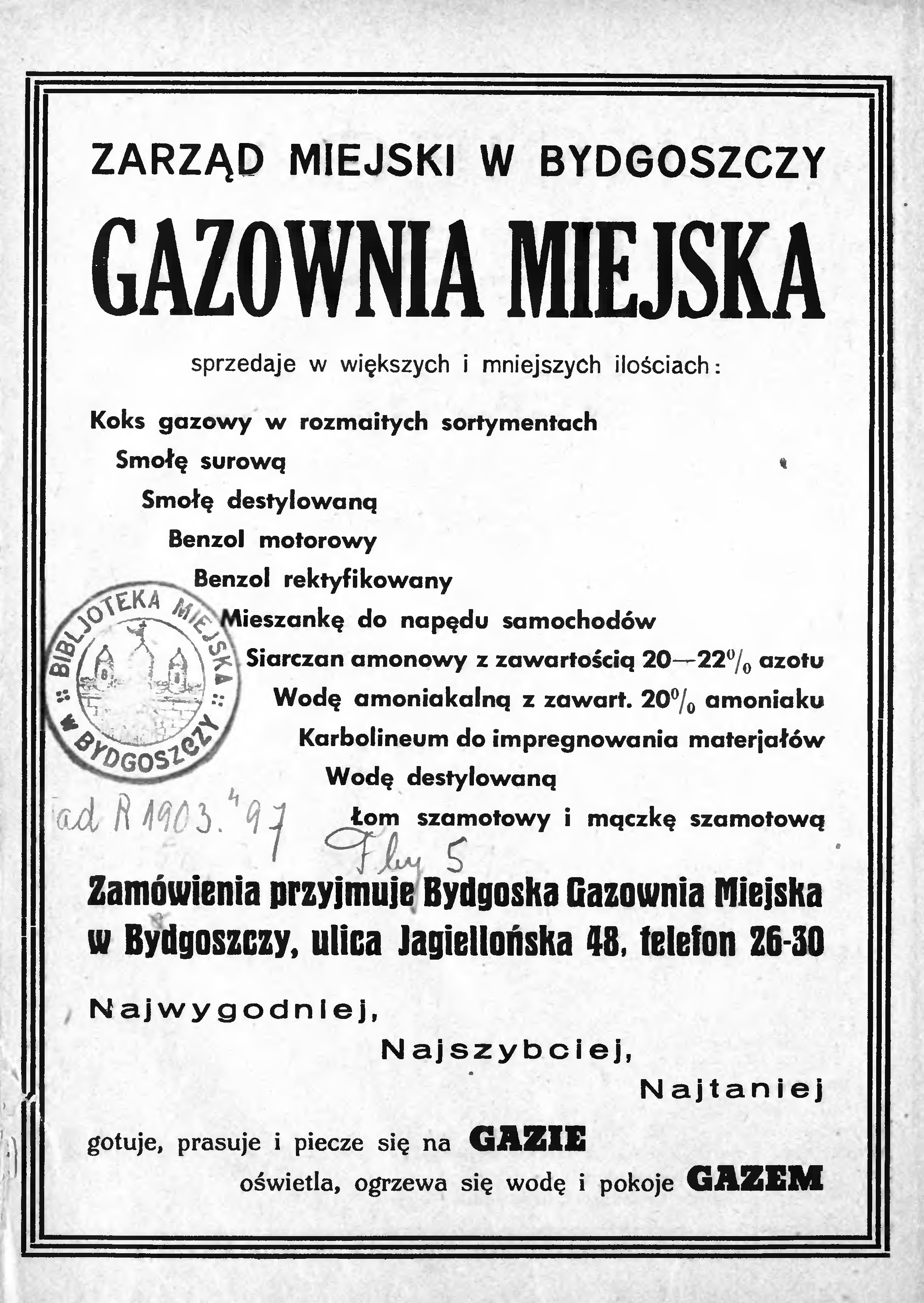
Advertising for City Gas, c. 1936

=== Interwar period ===
The company was taken over by the Polish authorities on 21 January 1920, while gas production reached then 3.7 million m^{3} [1]. Serious development of the gas factory began in 1925, when, with a Polish team managed by engineer Bronislaw Klimczak, the gasworks experienced a deep renovation, with the installation of several equipments:

- a new chamber geared with Dessau system,
- a new device for receiving and processing BTEX
- a machine for converting ammonium hydroxide, producing of ammonium sulfate, distillating coal tar, delivering Carbolineum.

Business began to improve in 1936-1939, with the construction of a new gas pipeline. During interwar, the gasworks had a shop at Ferdinand Foch street 5, and a showroom in the administrative building, where were held, inter alia, lectures and cooking demonstrations related to gas. Just before the outbreak of World War II company employed 150 people. Gas production grew up to 6.3 million m^{3} in 1938. Bydgoszcz gasworks was the largest in the Pomerania, and the 6th biggest plant of the Second Polish Republic.

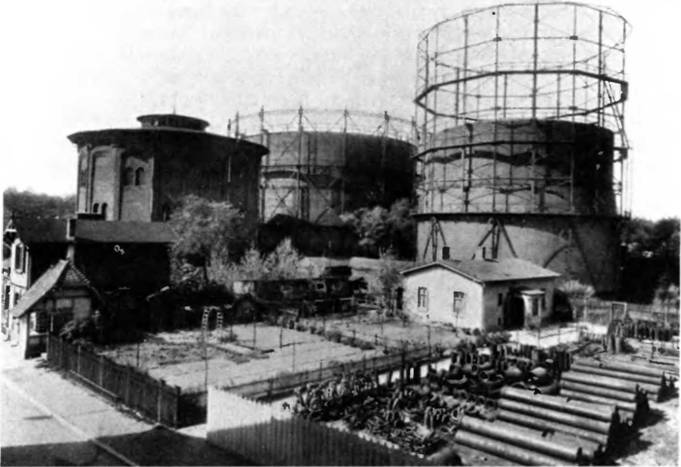
Gas tanks located at Jagiellońska 42

=== World War II period ===
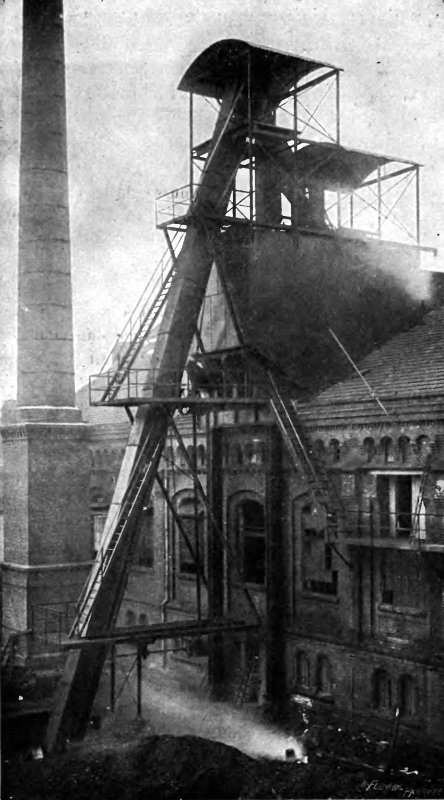
Coal transport system to the factory

In September 1939, the gasworks was taken over by nazi authorities and incorporated into the new Urban Department (German: Stadtwerke Bromberg), together with tram system, water supply, power plant and brickyards. In 1943, German engineers launched a third furnace and rebuilt two vertically-chamber system furnaces, "Didier", with a total capacity of 22000 m^{3} of gas per day. During the retreat, most of the facility and gas equipment have been destroyed.

=== Communist period ===
Immediately after the liberation, starting from January 1945, repair of the gasworks was launched, and gas production to the city resumed in February. With city population growth and industrial development, the demand for gas increased. At the same time Bydgoszcz began to move away from gas street lighting: the last town gas lamps have been removed at the beginning of the 1970s. In 1951, the complex evolved into "Bydgoszcz District Gas Plant". The plant gradually widened and modernized, in particular in 1946-1948 under the supervision of architect Jan Kossowski In the years 1950s, authorities recognized that the capacity of expansion of the gas complex along Jagiellońska Street were pretty limited, with regards to the urban development. As such, in 1955 it has been decided to build a new gas plant in the eastern industrial district.

Work started at Witebska street from 1962 to 1967, creating a first production capacity of about 100 000 m^{3}: the new gas plant was launched on 30 September 1967, and in 1973 the complex at Jagiellońska Street has been put out of service. The buildings, including the chimney, were demolished. At the end of the 1960s, a new gas distribution network has been built to connect the new plant to the different districts of the city. One of the first major pipelines ran from Sporna street to Wladyslaw Bełzy street along Toruńska street, with a length of about 4 km. From 1973 on, natural gas has been mainly used, pushing to expand the gas distribution network to newly built settlements in Bydgoszcz. Since 24 September 1990 only natural gas is supplied to customers, using pipelines from Grudziądz and Gniewkowo. Between 1987 and 1992 a complete replacement of the gas network in specific areas of the city has been carried out. Bydgoszcz gas company employs today 452 workers.

=== Current period ===
Since January 2000, Gasworks of Bydgoszcz functions as a branch of Polish Oil and Gas Company. In 2003, the plant became a branch of "Pomeranian Gas Company Sp. zoo", covering Kuyavian-Pomeranian Voivodeship and Chojnice, Czersk, Człuchów from Pomeranian Voivodeship.

Its business then included the distribution of natural gas, the network operation, maintenance and repair, together with quality controls checks of gas network. From June 2007 to October 2008, Bydgoszcz plant operated under the name "Pomorski Branch Operator System of Gas Distribution in Bydgoszcz" (Polish: Pomorski Operator Systemu Dystrybucyjnego Oddział Dystrybucji Gazu w Bydgoszczy), as a Distribution network operator. At the end of 2008, its name changed to "Pomeranian Gas Company, Branch Gas Plant of Bydgoszcz" (Polish: Pomorska Spółka Gazownictwa Oddział Zakład Gazowniczy w Bydgoszczy).

== Architecture ==
The edifice on Jagiellońska Street displays historicism features, leaning on Neoclassical style.

The vast elevation is built on a balanced facade, symmetric distribution of windows, enhanced by the two gates on each side of the middle avant-corps. Bossage in corner places and a triangular pediment above the avant-corps add to the impressive effect of the frontage.

== Gallery ==
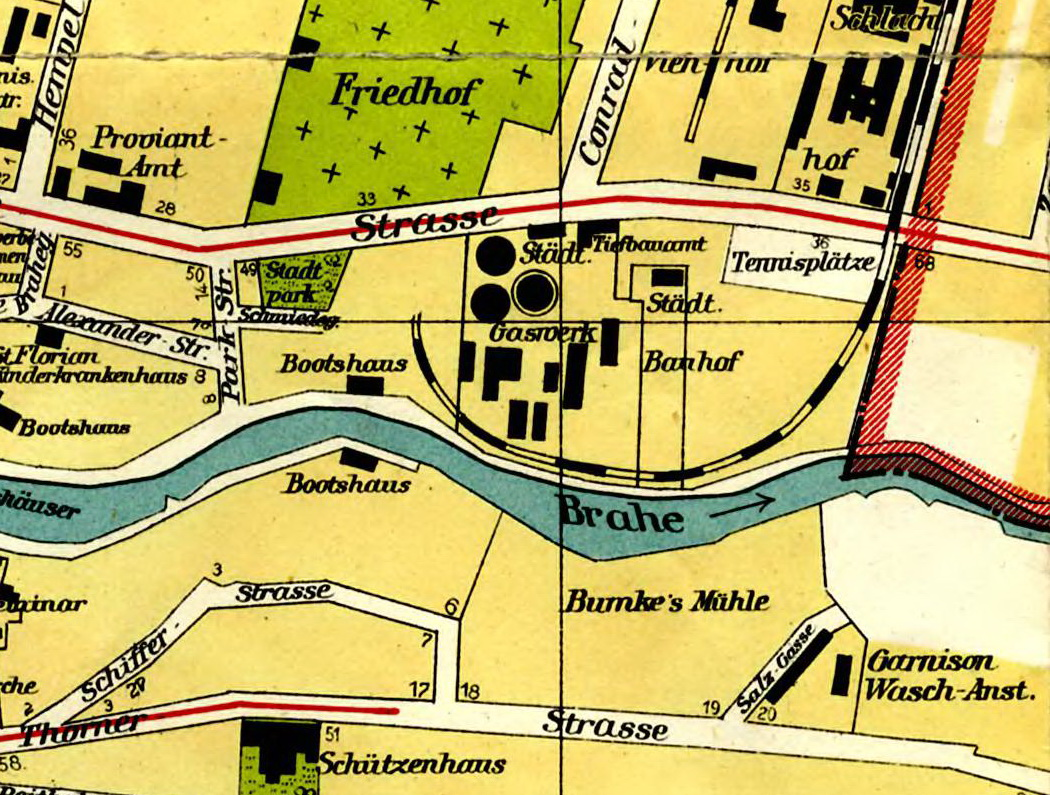
Gasworks on 1914 Bromberg map, with railway network

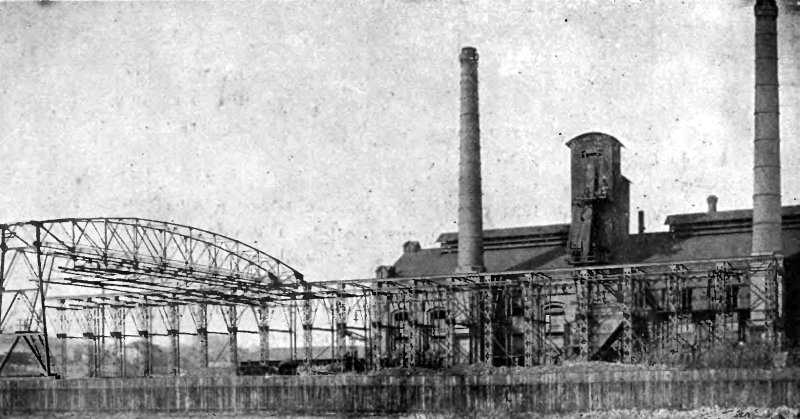
View of Jagiellońska street complex beginning of 20th century

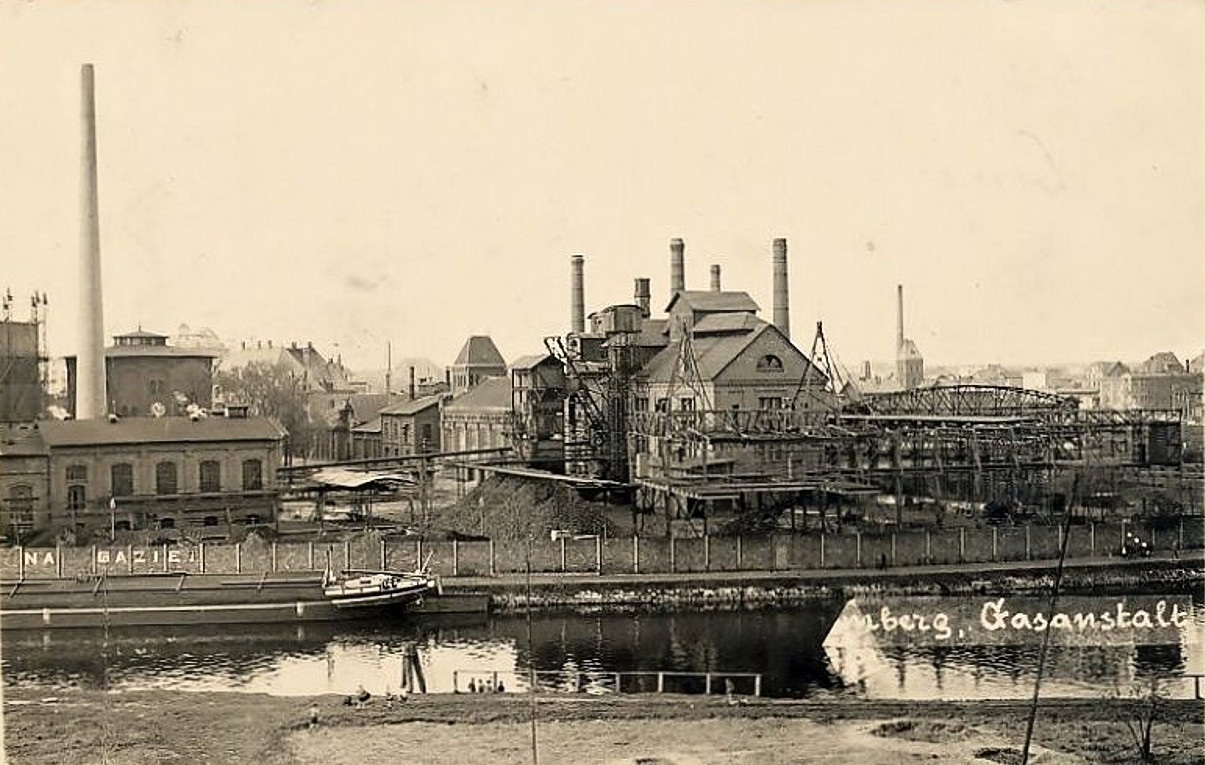
View of the gas complex from the other side of the Brda river, c. 1900

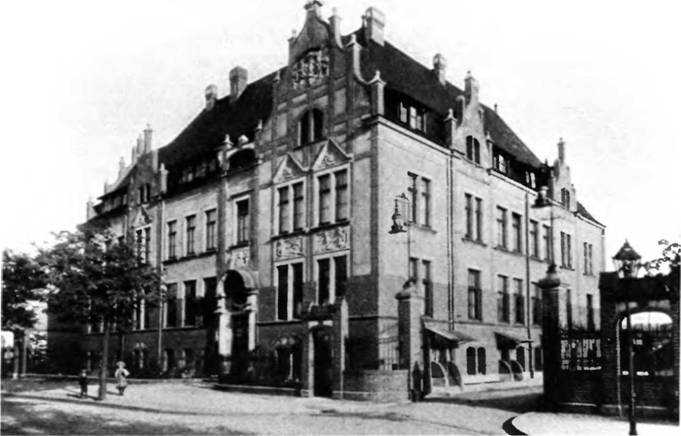
The administrative house in 1906

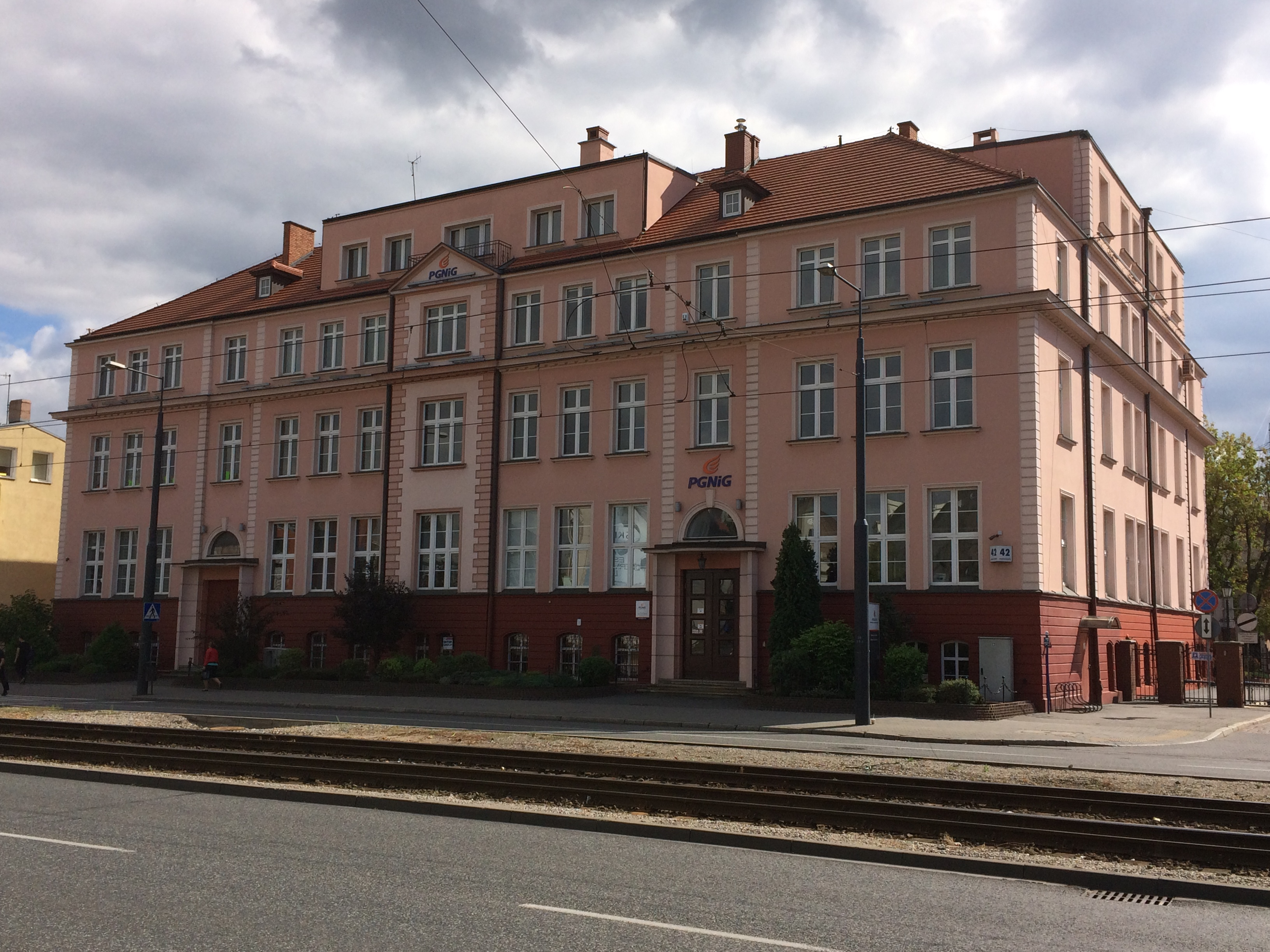
Administrative building, view from Jagiellońska Street
