= Carl Walter Meyer =

South African artist (1965–2017)

Carl Walter Meyer (31 January 1965 – 22 December 2017) was a South African artist born in Aliwal North, Eastern Cape. Meyer graduated from the University of Pretoria with a degree in Fine Art. He furthered his studies at the "Staatliche Kunstakademie” in Düsseldorf, West Germany, under professor Michael Buthe. He was living in Upington, Northern Cape at the time of his death.

== Life ==
Meyer matriculated with a distinction in art in 1982. As a university student Meyer also got distinctions for his fine-arts degree at the University of Pretoria, winning the New Signature prize for painting in 1984. Meyer studied under Professor Nico Roos and John Clarke. He rose to prominence in the early 1990s with his distinctive landscape studies. Walter Meyer painted landscapes, portraits, still life, wildlife and abstract paintings and he also sculpted in wood He was married first to Catharina Scheepers and then to Sophia (maiden surname unknown). Meyer and Scheepers finalised their divorce in 2008. He lived with his second wife Sophia Meyer in the housing suburb of Augrabies Park in Upington, Northern Cape. They married on 27 June 2010. The couple had a troubled marriage and his wife Sophia Meyer is accused of his murder.

== Work ==
Meyer has work hanging in New York and the South African Art Gallery. He was represented by Everard Read Gallery. Professor Andries Bezuidenhout claims that Walter Meyer painted the demise of Afrikaner nationalism. Meyer has become known for expressing the mundane and less desirable side of reality. His style was inspired by quality of the light at dawn or dusk, and the heat of the arid desert landscapes. Meyer's paintings have been compared to works by Pierneef.

== Death ==
Meyer was found dead at his home in Upington on 28 December 2017. The Northern Cape police spokesperson Lieutenant-Colonel Dimakatso Mooi said Meyer was stabbed with a sharp object. Meyer was allegedly involved in a quarrel with his wife and she allegedly stabbed him in the chest.

== Exhibitions ==
- (1984) New Signatures Exhibition, SAAA, Pretoria
- (1985) Solo exhibition, Pierneef Gallery, Pretoria, Group exhibition "Junger Westen", Recklinghausen, Group exhibition "Perspective 3" Düsseldorf Kunsthalle, Germany
- (1985) Exhibition with Ansgar Skiba, Zipora Rafaelov Station Kunst Ratingen, Group exhibition "Mini Show" Gallerie Now, New York, Group exhibition "The Emerging Collector", New York, Group exhibition "Michael Buthe und seine Klasse", Bonn
- (1987) New Signatures Exhibition, SAAA, Pretoria, Standard Bank National Drawing Exhibition
- (1988) Three man exhibition, Gallery 21, Johannesburg
- (1990) Solo exhibition, The Loft gallery, Windhoek, Namibia
- (1991) Exhibits and works as resident artist, Dal Josafat Art Foundation, Paarl, Private solo exhibition, Johannesburg, Group exhibition, "Some Innocent Eyes", Newtown Gallery, Jhb.
- (1993) -Four person exhibition, Newtown Gallery, Jhb, Volkskas Atelier travelling group exhibition, Group exhibition, Everard Read Gallery, Jhb.
- (1994)'New Signatures' exhibition, SAAA, Pretoria, Solo exhibition, 'Present in the Landscape', Newtown Gallery, Jhb, Group exhibition "The Walls Sing", Oliewenhuis Art Museum, Bloemfontein
- (1995) "Groundswell", Contemporary S A Art, Mermaid Theatre, London, Solo exhibition, Newtown Gallery, Jhb
- (1996) Four man exhibition "Landscapes of SA", Art First Gallery, Cork St., London
- (1997) Solo exhibition, NSA Gallery, Durban, Solo exhibition, Old Arts Gallery, University of Pretoria, Group exhibition "Lifetimes, an exhibition of SA Art", Munich, Group exhibition "Cyst: Works in paint", The Castle, Cape Town
- (1998) Group exhibition, Open Window Gallery, Pretoria, Private exhibition, Cape Town
- (1999) Two-man exhibition with Guy de Toit at Knysna Fine Art, Solo exhibition at Oliewenhuis Art Museum, Bloemfontein.
- (2000) Solo exhibition at Johans Borman Fine Art Gallery, Cape Town, Solo Exhibition Everard Read Gallery, Johannesburg.
- (2009) Walter Meyer "Cape to Kalahari" Exhibition Tina Skukan Gallery, Pretoria

== See also ==
- Jacobus Hendrik Pierneef
- Crime of passion
