= 20 January 1920 Street, Bydgoszcz =

Street in Bydgoszcz, Poland

Coordinates: 53°07′54″N 18°00′45″E

20 Stycznia 1920 Street
Bydgoszcz
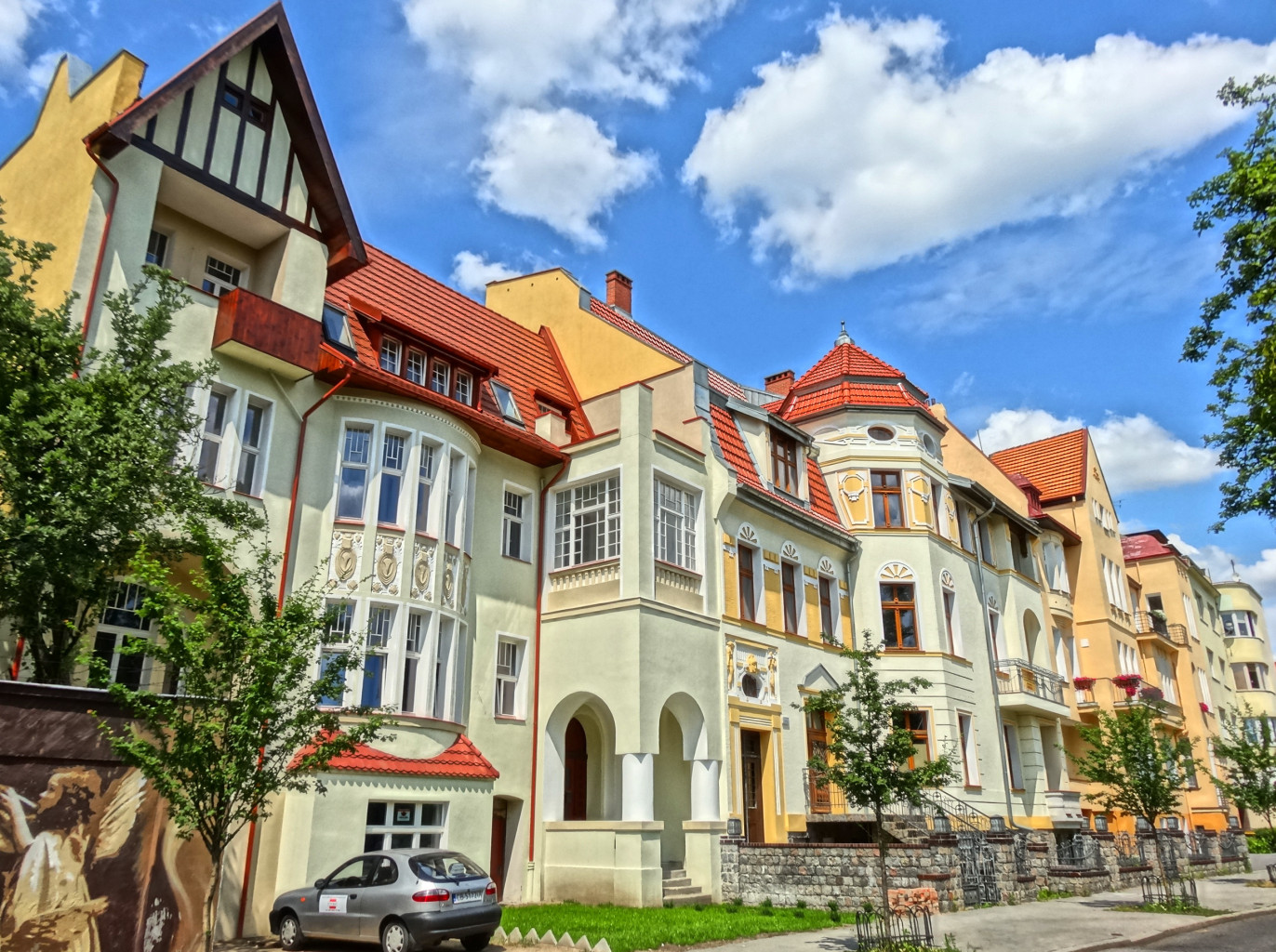
- View of street facades

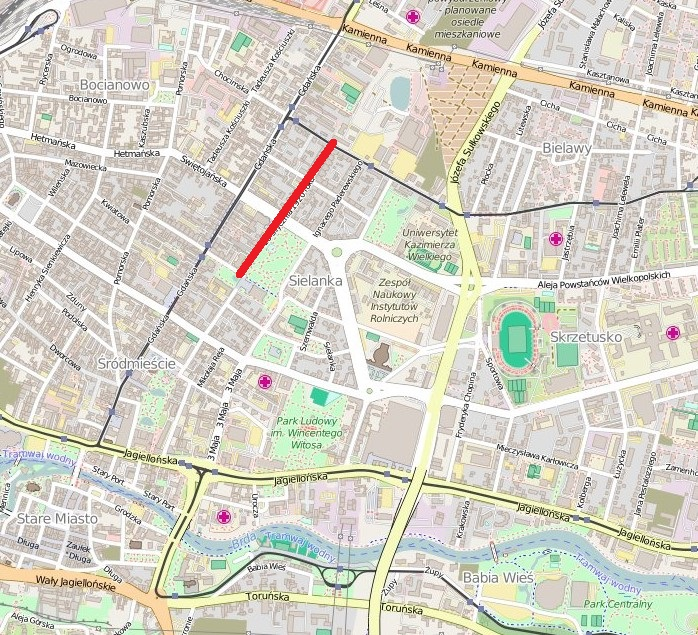
- Street path highlighted
- Native name: Ulica 20 Stycznia 1920 (Polish)
- Former name: Goethe Straße
- Namesake: January 20, 1920
- Owner: City of Bydgoszcz
- Length: 550 m (1,800 ft)Google maps
- Width: ca. 10m
- Area: Downtown district
- Location: Bydgoszcz, Poland

Construction
- Construction start: Beginning of the 20th century
- Completed: Before 1908

20 Stycznia 1920 Street is located in downtown district, in Bydgoszcz, Poland. Many of the buildings along this axis are either registered on the Kuyavian-Pomeranian Voivodeship heritage list, or part of a historical ensemble of Eclectic and Art Nouveau architecture in the city.

== Location ==
Located in downtown district, the street unfolds on an approximate south–north axis, parallel to Gdańska street on the west and Staszica and Paderewskiego Streets on the east. The southern tip of the street (odd numbers till 9) faces the agreeable Jan Kochanowski Park.

== History ==
On an 1876 map by Paul Berthold Jaekel, as well as on an 1880 map, the axis is drawn, without any mention of the name. The first map to reference the street dates back to 1908, where it is named Goethestraße.

In Bromberg's address books, the lane is mentioned in 1905 as being under construction. The following year only three edifices are listed in Goethestraße :

- the Kreishaus, today's Bydgoszcz Music Academy building, at the corner of Słowackiego Street, then Bismarckstraße;
- a house at Goethestraße 8;
- a building at Goethestraße 37, today's house at Nr.2.

=== Naming ===
The pathway was known as Goethestraße, from its construction to 1920 and during German occupation (1939–1945). The name referred to the famous German writer and statesman Johann Wolfgang von Goethe (1749–1832).

The current name 20 Stycznia 1920 Street , was adopted on September 13, 1921, by the city council to celebrate the date of the signature of the Act on citizenship of the Polish State, which came in force on January 31, 1920, and underlined the re-creation of the Polish sovereign nation. The communist period modified in 1948, the name of the street to 24 January 1945, commemorating the liberation of Bydgoszcz from German forces.

The street has been bearing the current name since June 26, 1989.

== Main edifices ==
=== Bydgoszcz Music Academy building at 7 Słowackiego Street, corner with 20 Stycznia 1920 Street ===
Registered on Kuyavian-Pomeranian Voivodeship heritage list, Nr.601404-Reg.A/782/1-3 (May 8, 1992)

1904–1906

Neo-Baroque

The building has been initially erected to house the administrative services of the district authorities (German: Kreishaus) at the beginning of the 20th century. It now accommodates the seat of the Bydgoszcz Music Academy - "Feliks Nowowiejski".

The edifice presents an eclectic architecture, with a predominance of Neo-Baroque forms.

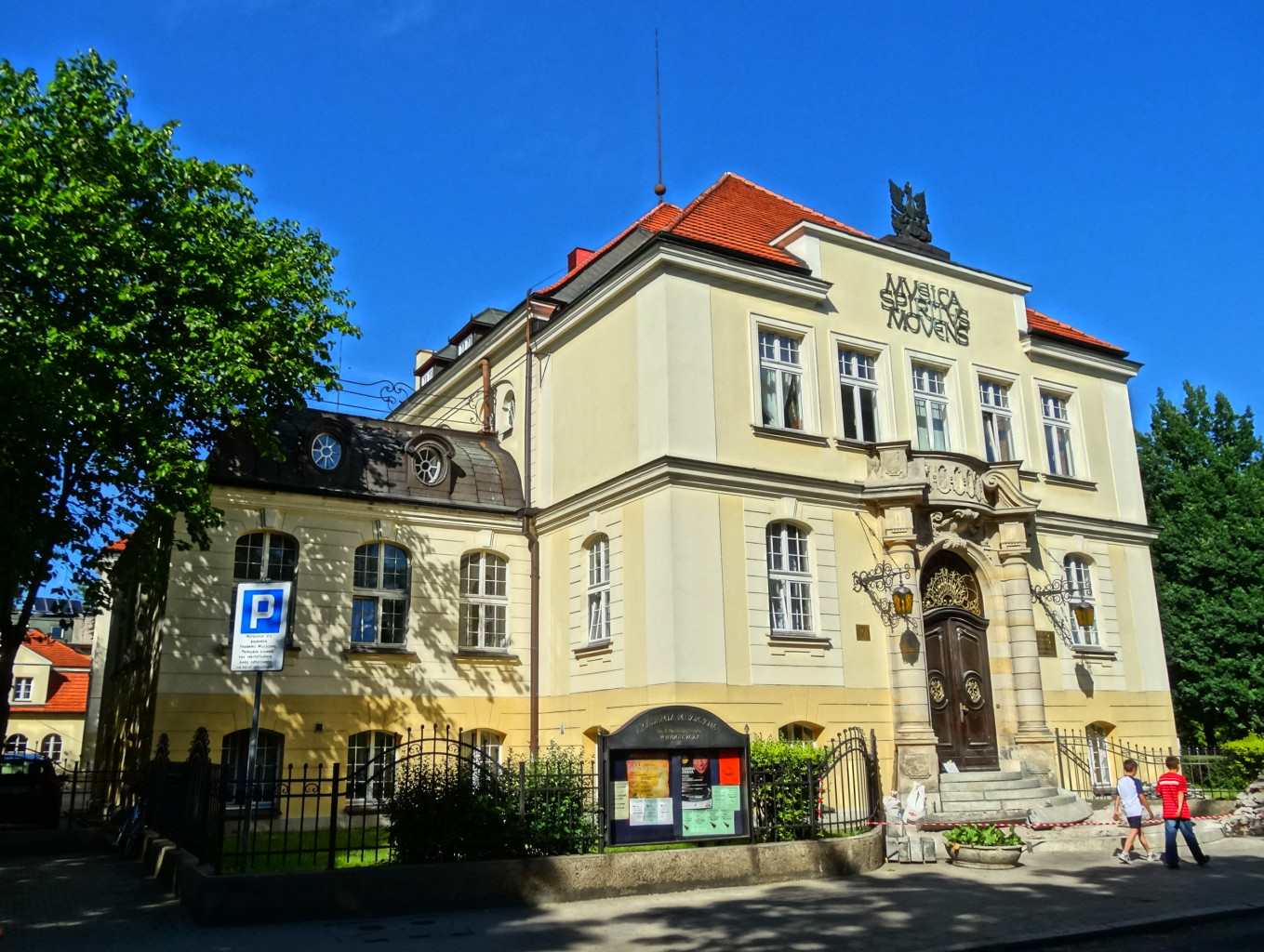
Facade on Słowackiego Street

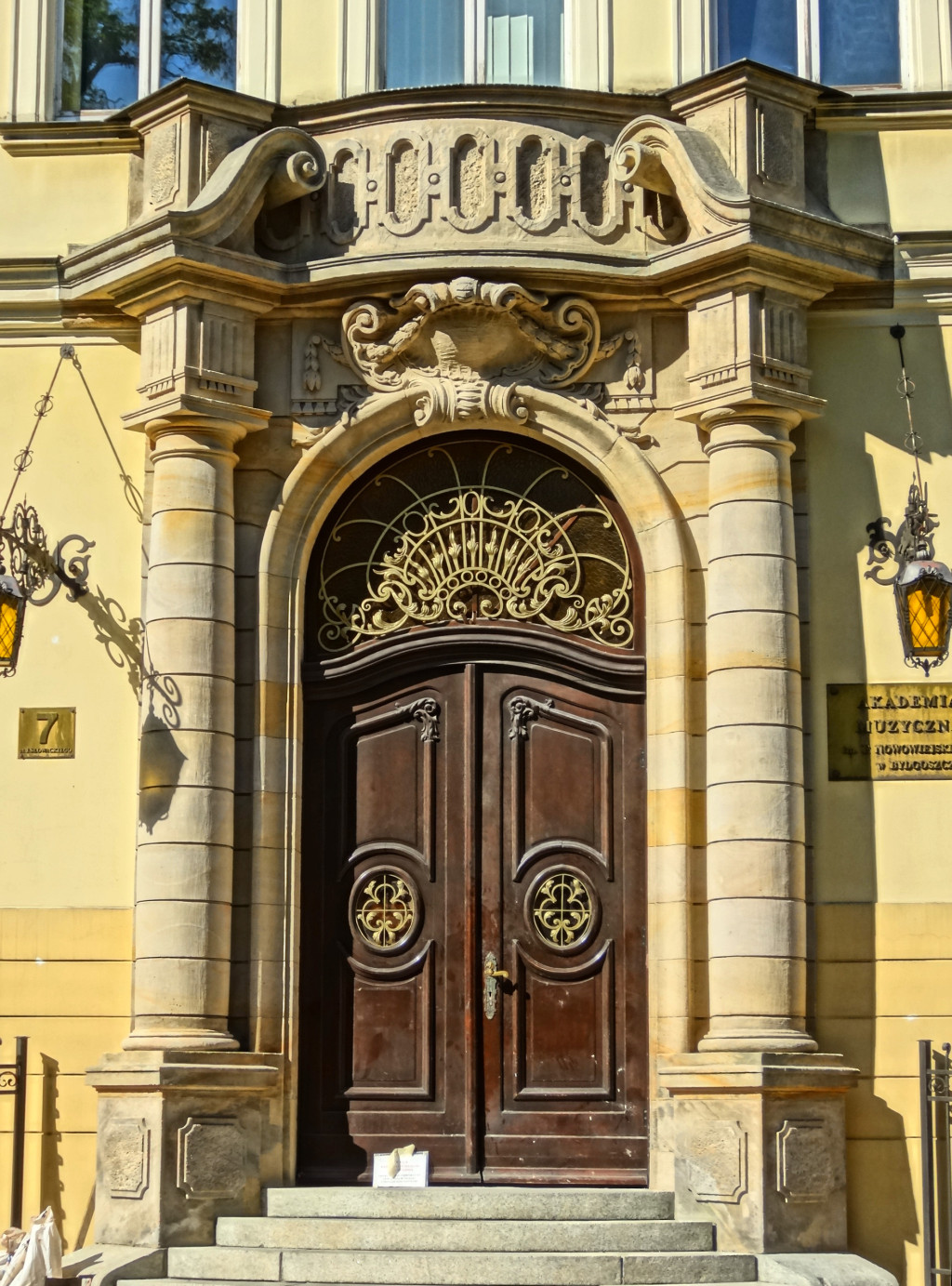
Main portal

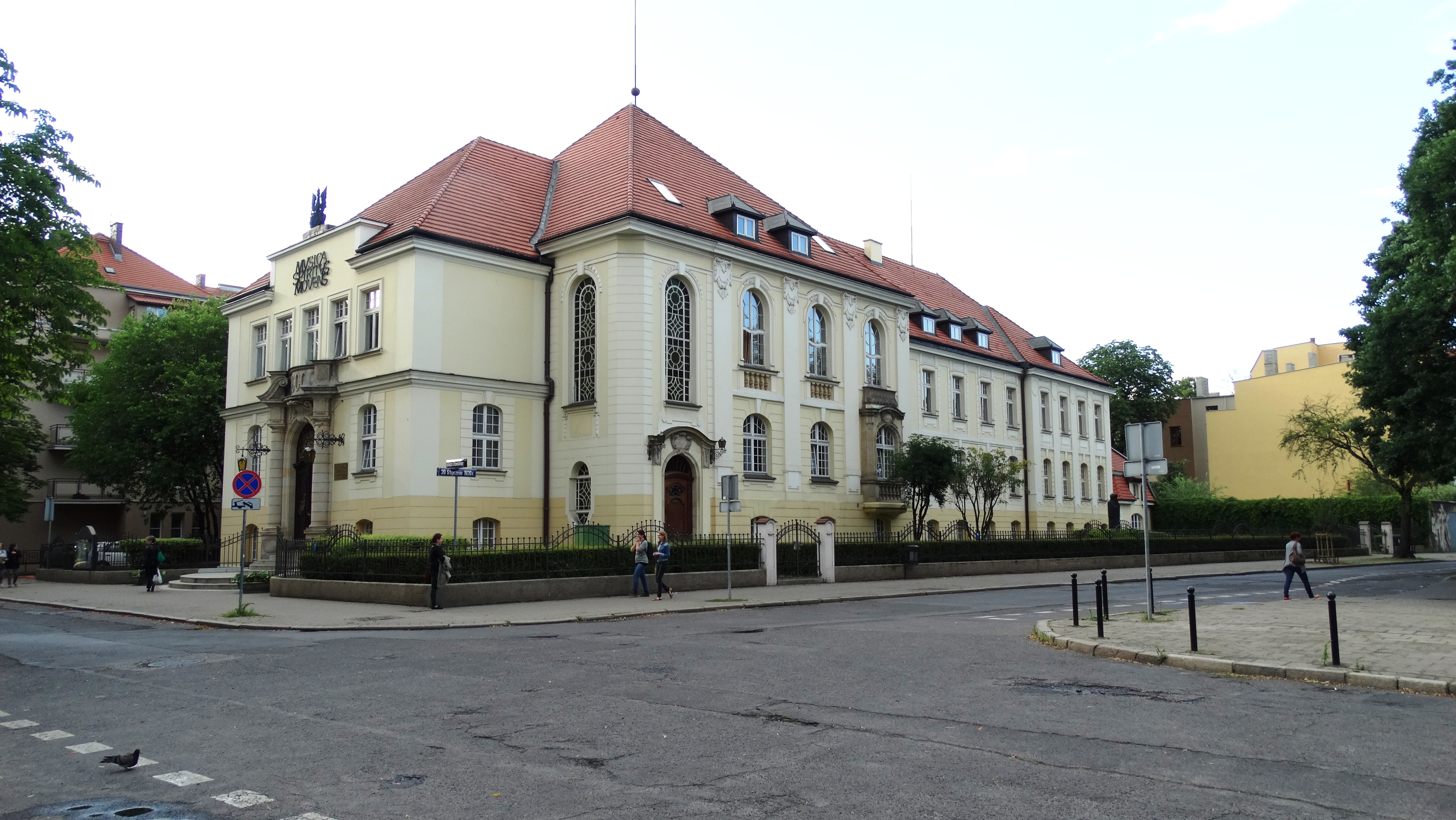
View from the Pomeranian Philharmonic building

=== Plot at 1 ===
The wall adorned with a mural of angels fences the garden of the "Chapel of the Sisters of the Poor Clares. The latter is located at 56 Gdańsk Street. The monastery was established in Bydgoszcz on September 14, 1925.

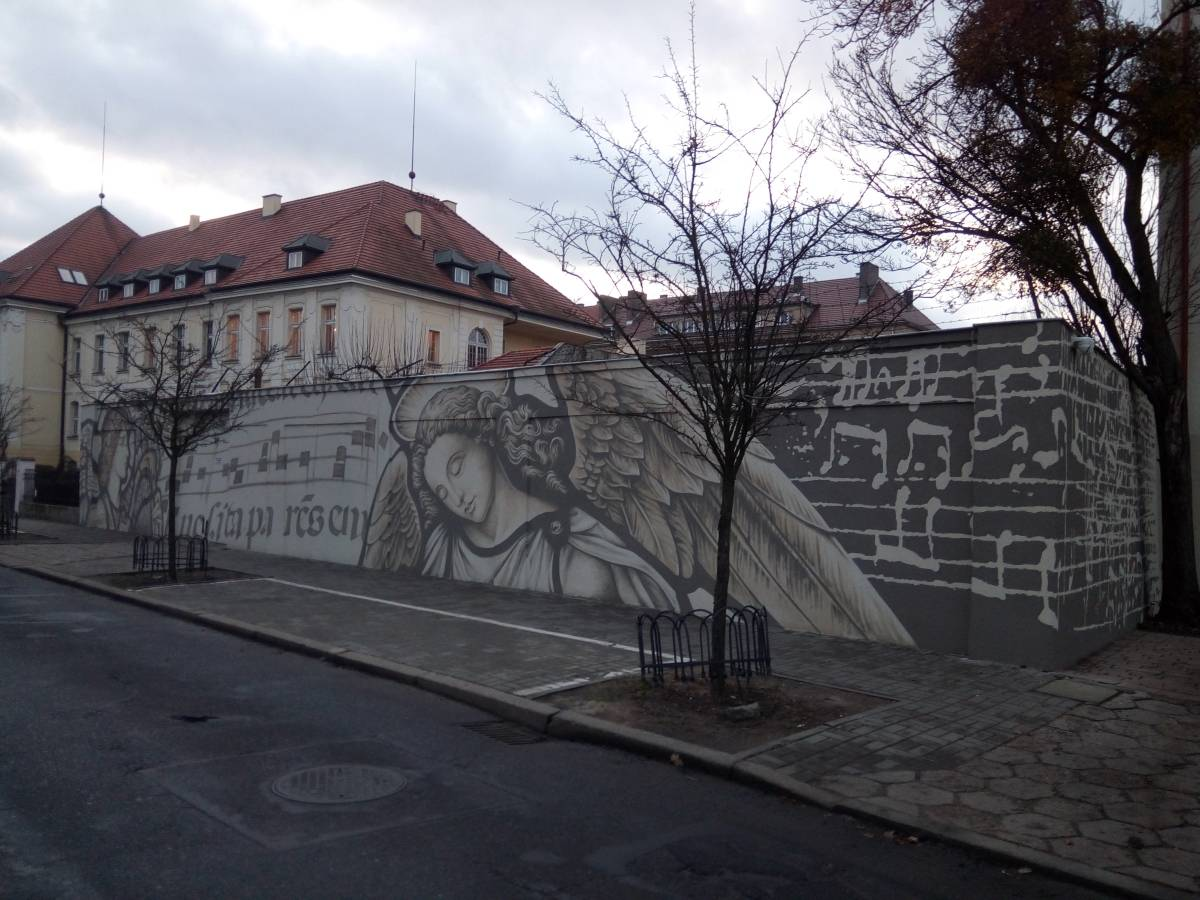
Mural of the garden of the Sisters of the Poor Clares

=== Tenement at 2, corner with Adam Mickiewicz Alley ===
1903, by Rudolf Kern

Art Nouveau

In the 1906's address book, the edifice is identified as new building (German: Neubau), belonging to the merchant Julius Berger and located at then Goethestraße 37. During the occupation, an annex of the NSDAP was housed there.

This corner house displays Art Nouveau features, especially in the ornamental details of the three avant-corps sections, the lean pilasters and the ogee-shape wall dormers, as well as the well adorned portal.

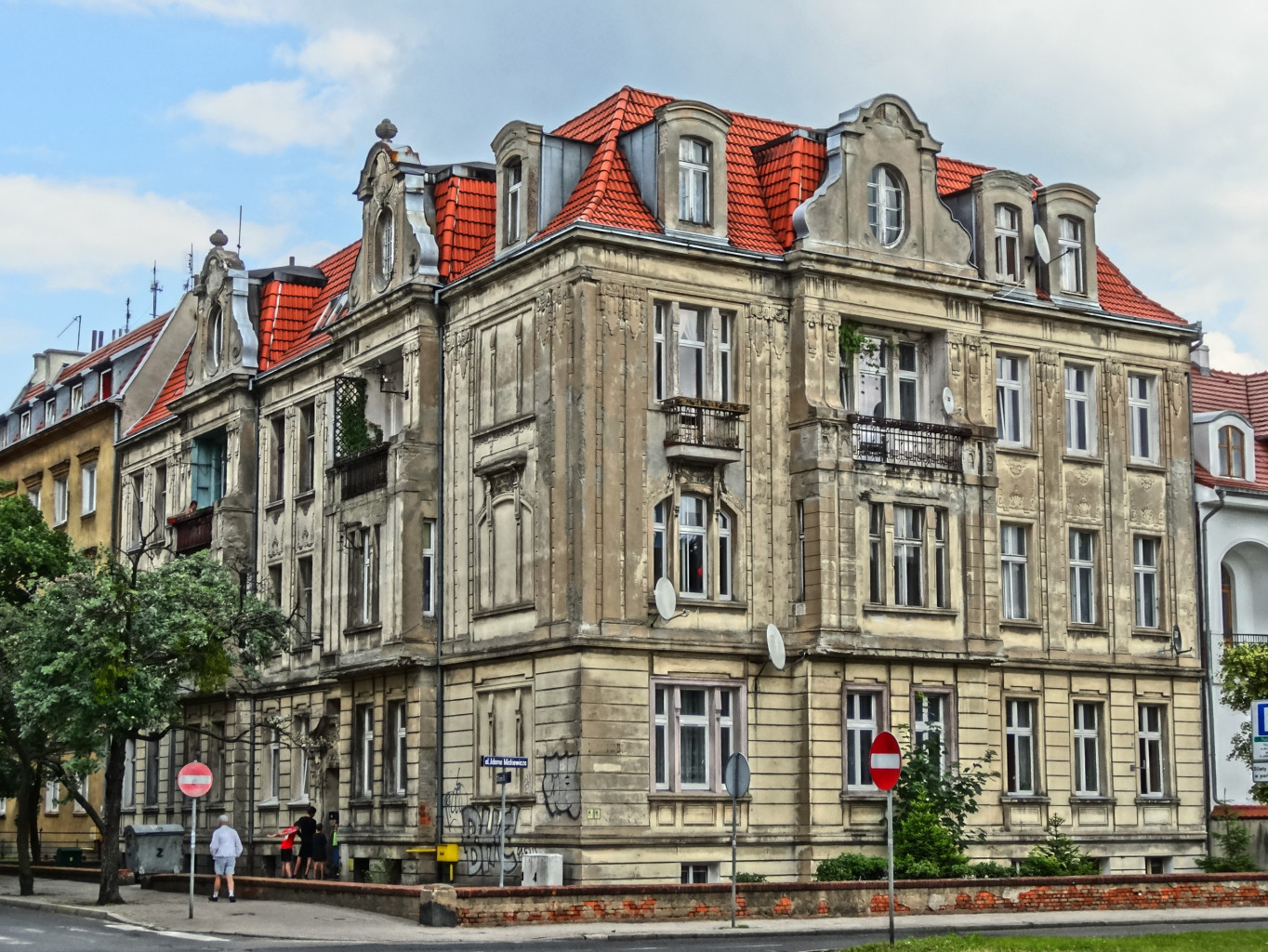
General view of both frontages

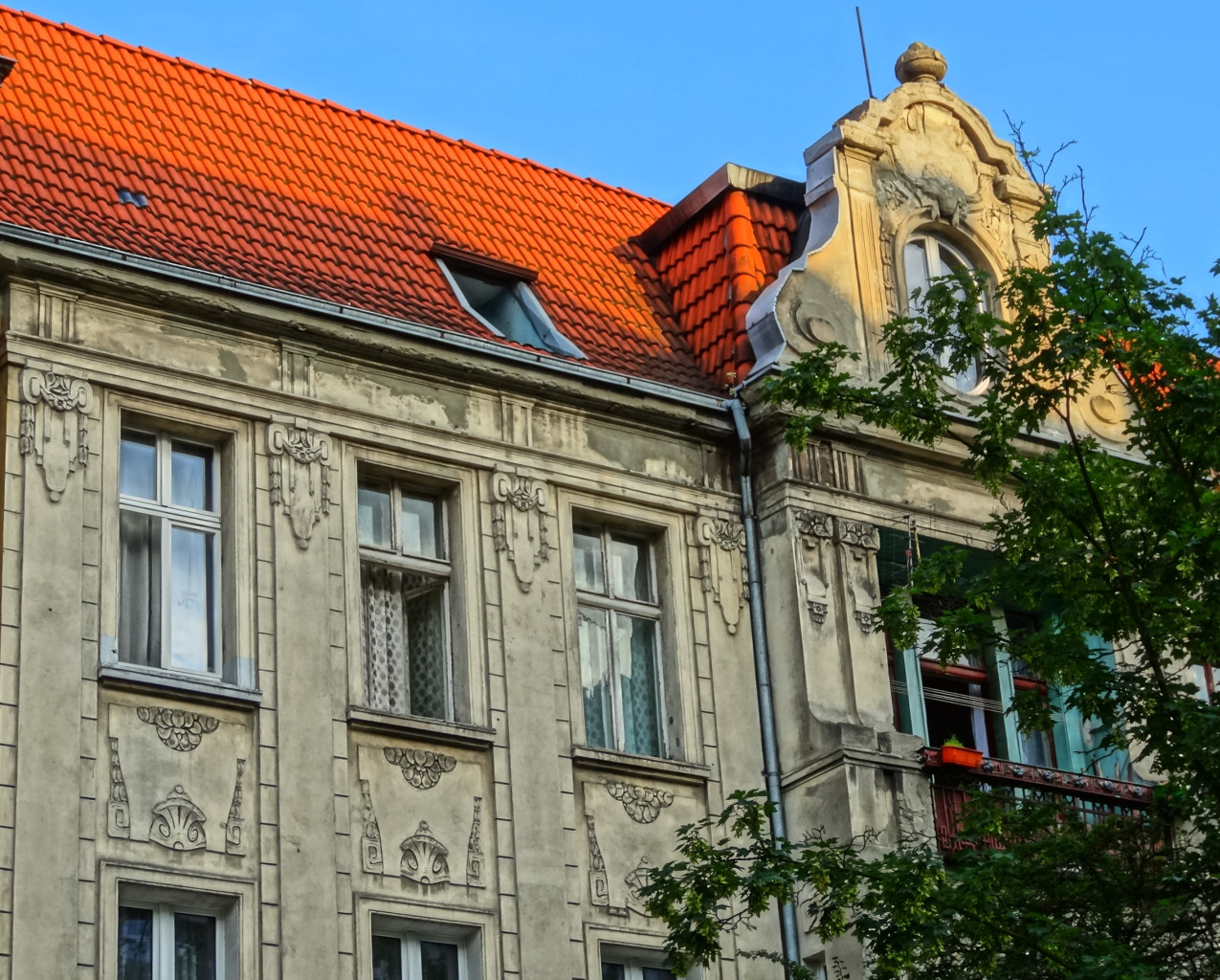
Detailed view of facade decoration

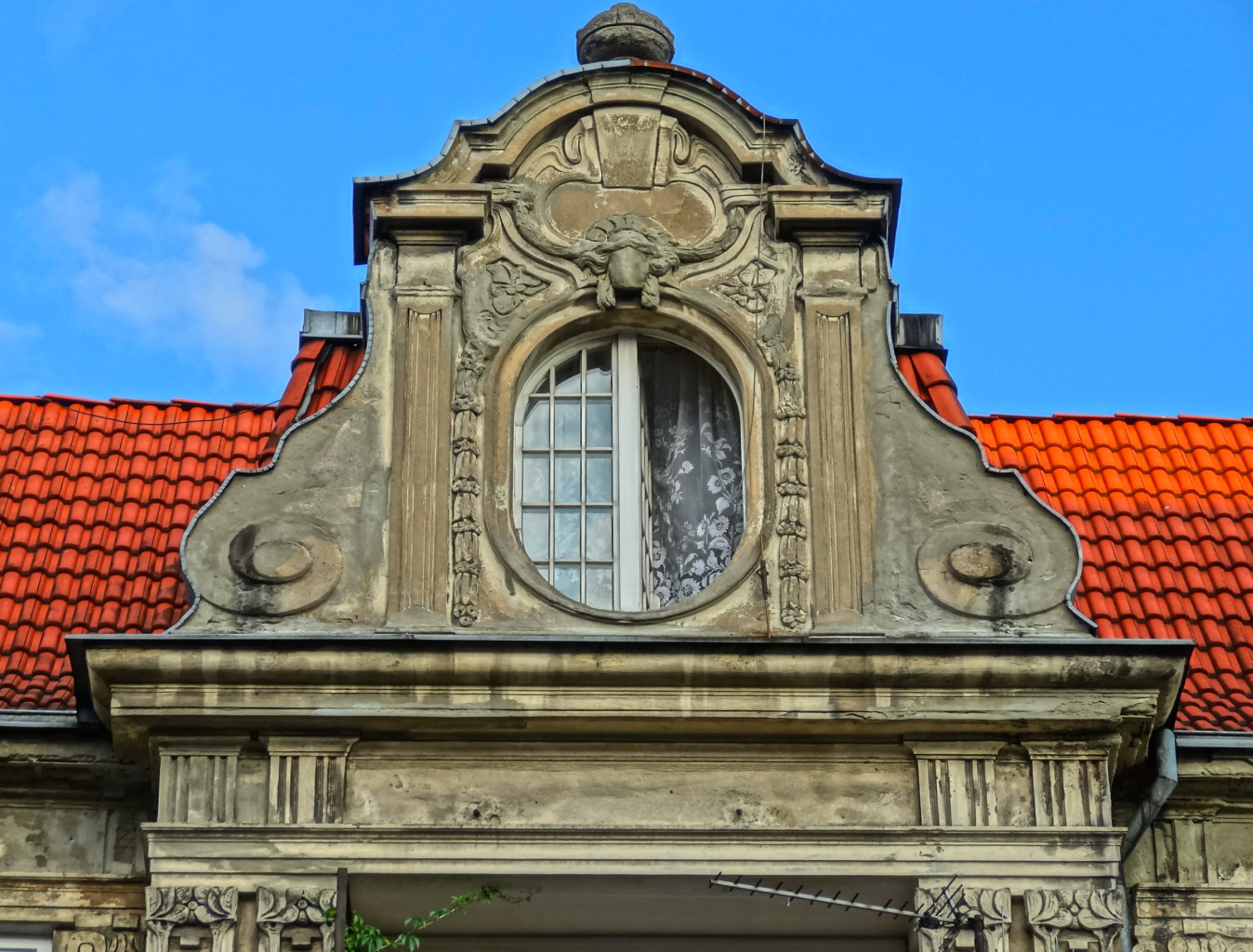
Adorned wall dormer

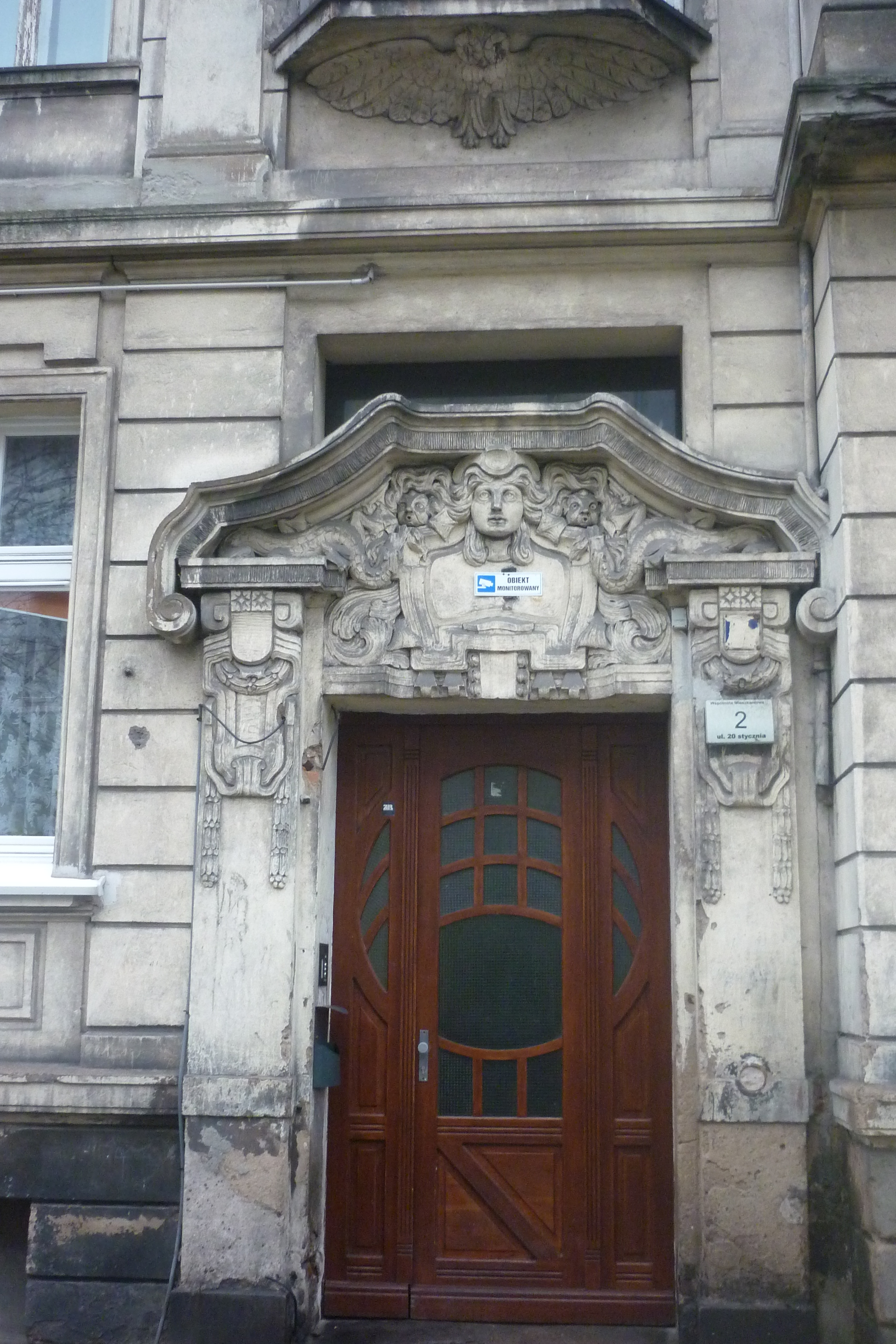
Detail of the gate ornamentation

=== Oskar Unverferth House at 3 ===
1907, by Fritz Weidner

Eclecticism

Although registered as a 1905 construction, the building is only listed in 1908. It was a commission from Oskar Unverferth, who ran a furniture factory. The designer was Fritz Weidner, a famous city architect in Bydgoszcz. Oskar Unverferth moved there in 1908 and remained landlord till 1922.

The villa is characteristic of the Landhaus style that Fritz Weidner more than often applied to his realizations in Bydgoszcz. A myriad of architectural details on the asymmetrical facades (bow windows, balconies, arches, Art Nouveau motifs), make the villa resemble a country house. The house was entirely refurbished in 2012.

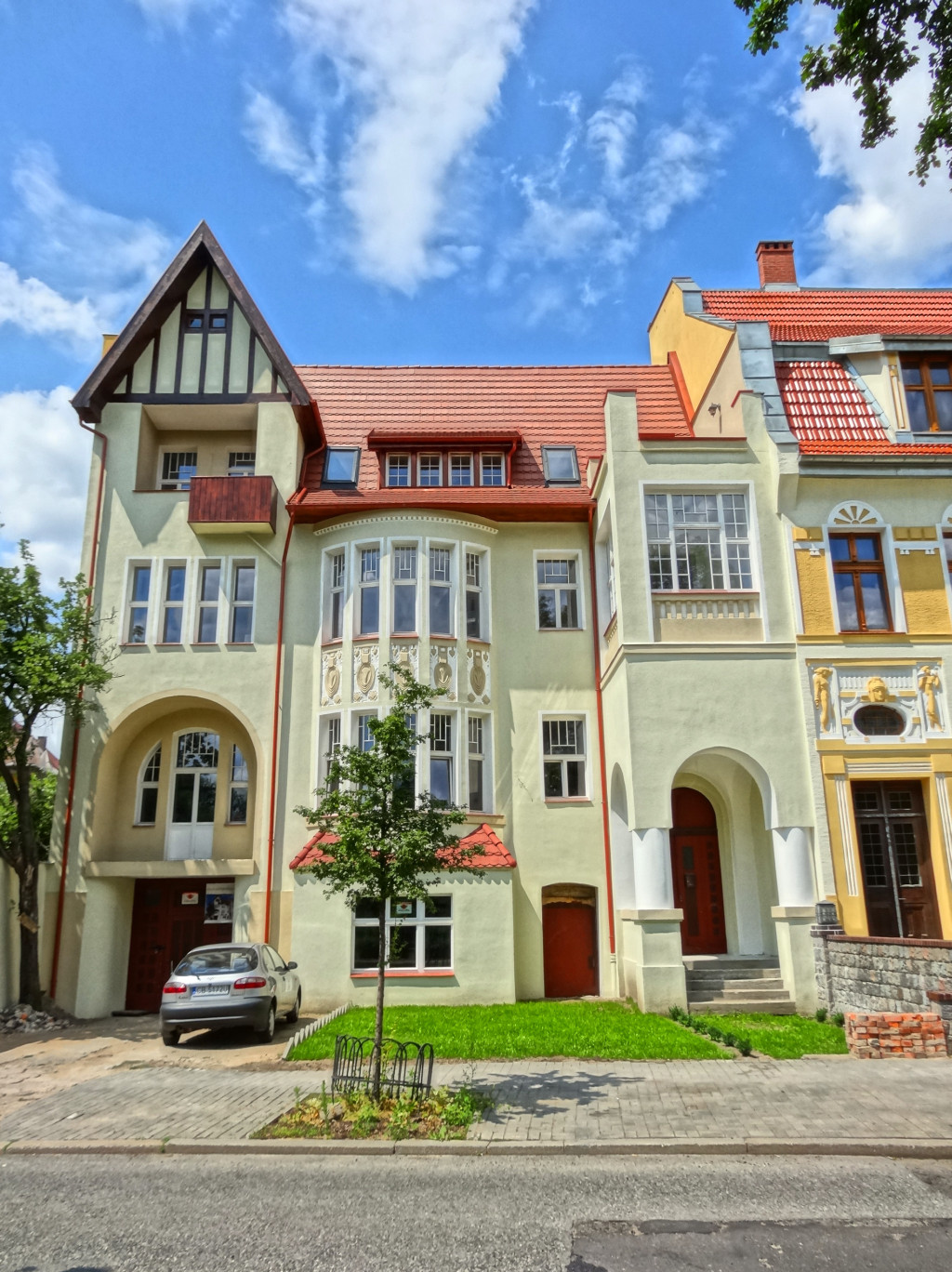
View from the street

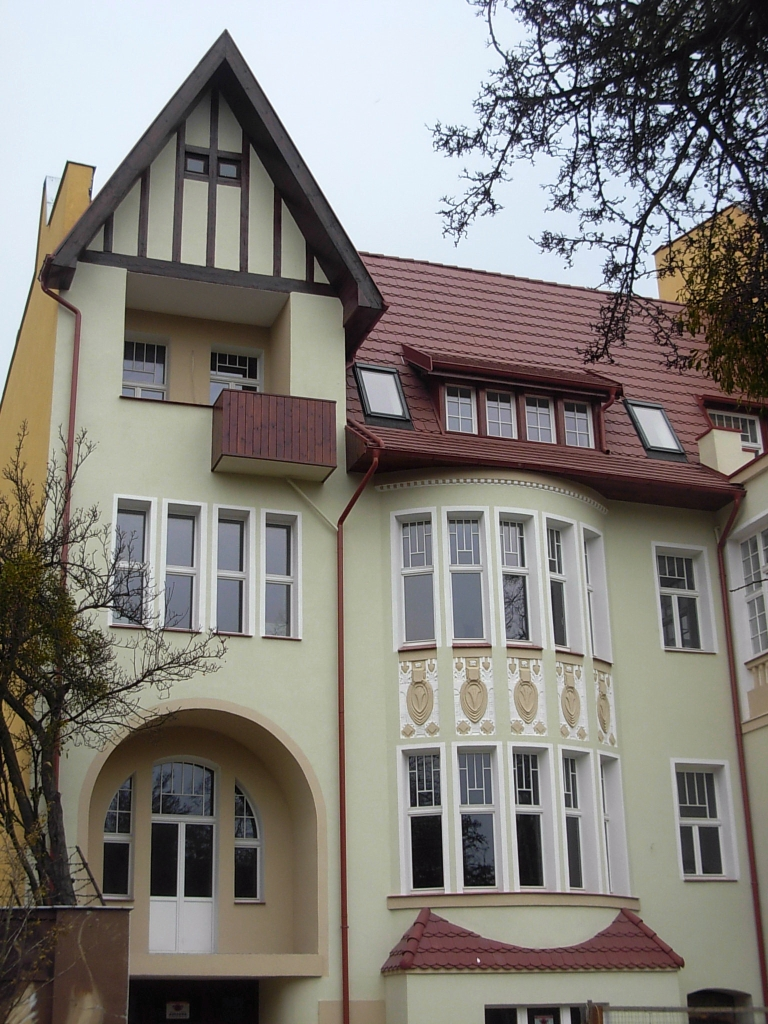
View of upper levels

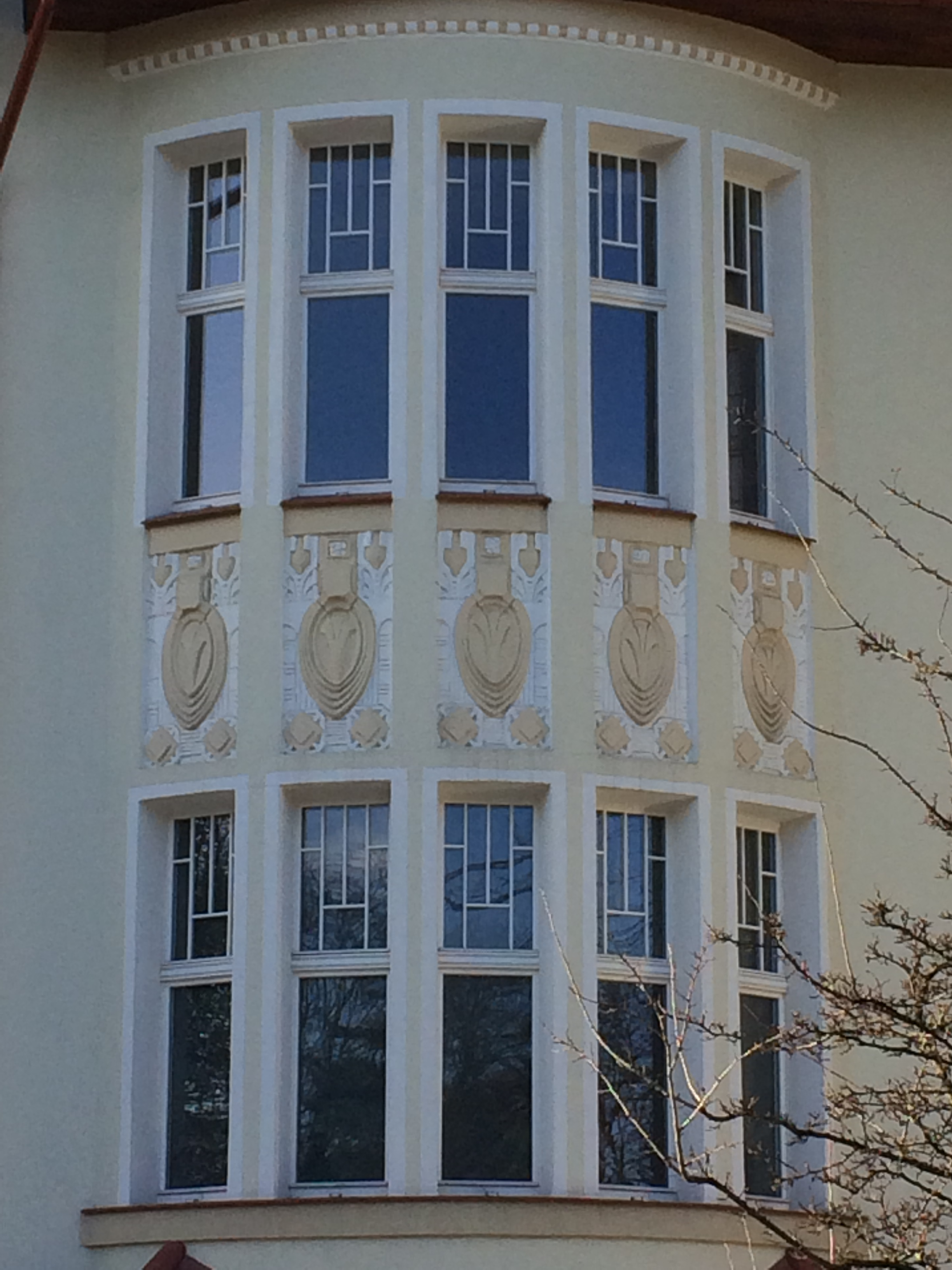
Detail of the bow window

=== House Meyer at 5 ===
1906 by Carl Meyer

Art Nouveau

On the plot at then Goethestraße 4, Carl Meyer, Bromberg building councilor and designer, had built his own house in the early 20th century. Carl Meyer is one of the most influential architects in the city, from the 1880s to 1912, year of his retirement from his position as building councilor. He lived there until he left Bydgoszcz in 1919.

Reflecting its neighbour at Nr.3, the villa boasts Art Nouveau references, especially in the embellished portal of the front door, topped by an oval transom light.

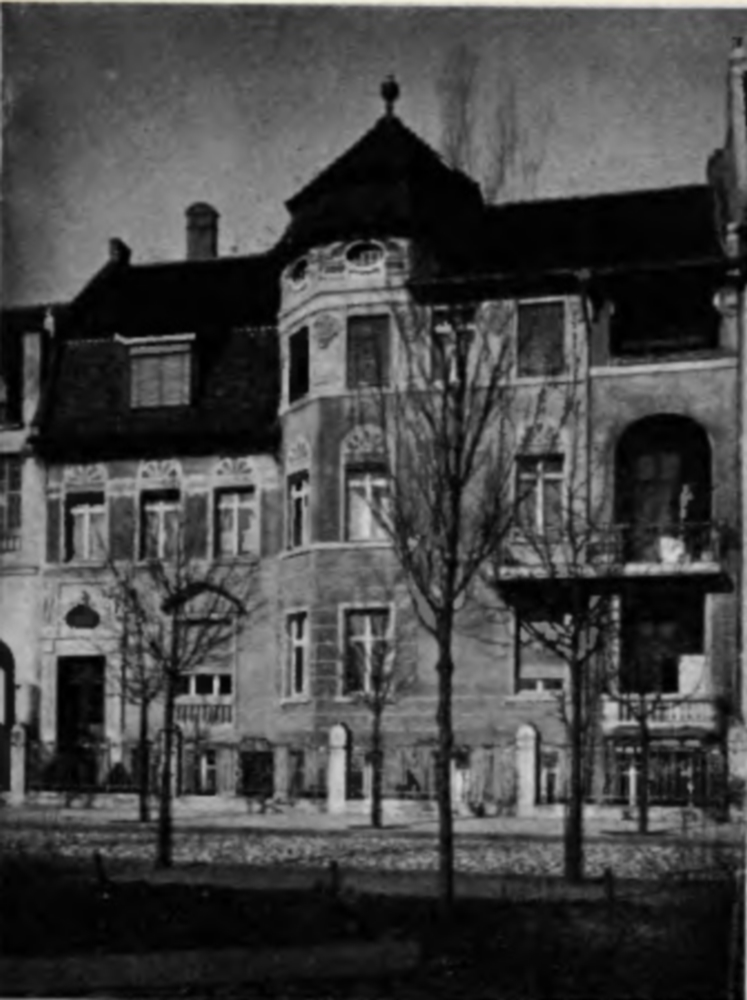
House ca 1920

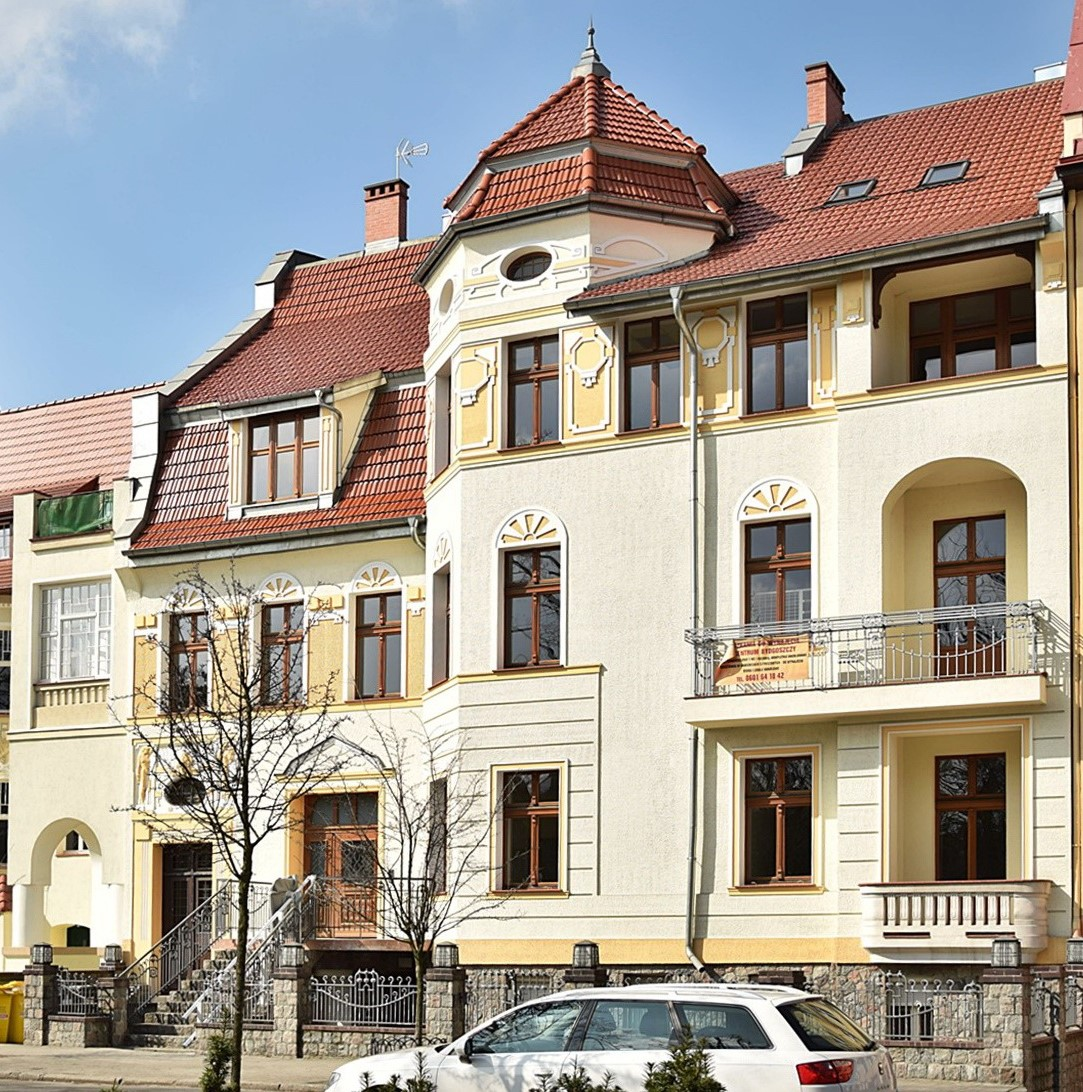
House frontage today, seen from the park

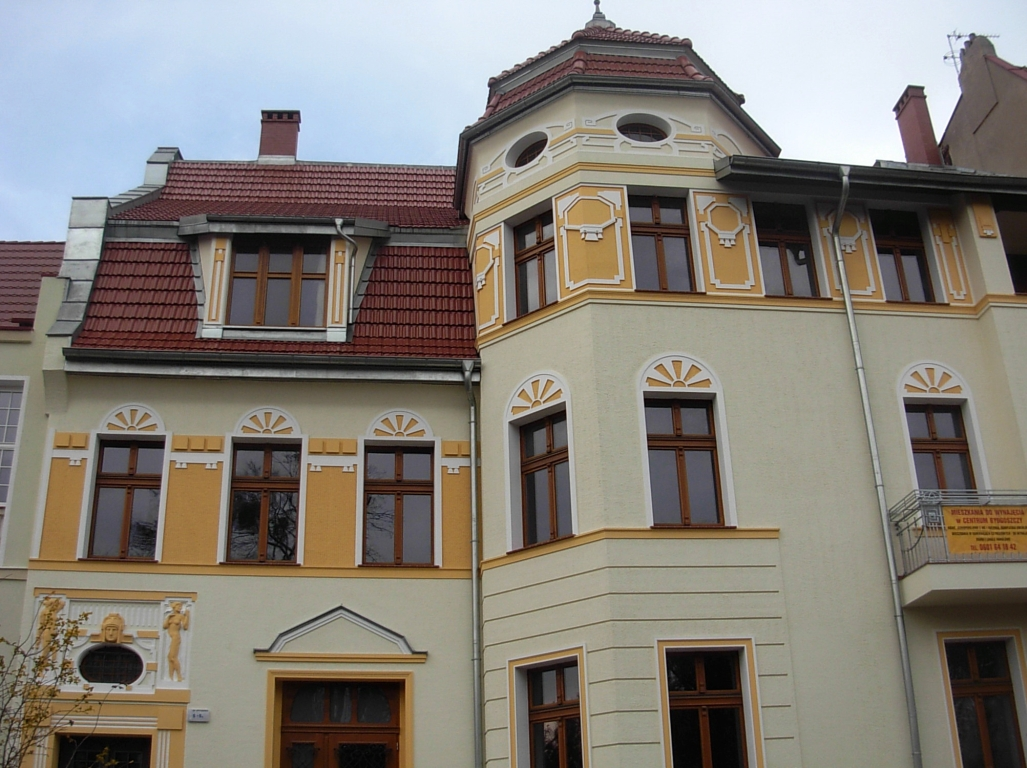
Detailed upper levels

=== House at 6 ===
1911, by Emil Heydemann

Eclecticism

Hermann Draheim, a rentier, was the first landlord of this tenement in the 1910s, located at then Goethestraße 35. [[Witold Bełza]], librarian, writer, publicist, cultural activist and director of the City Library lived there from 1920 to 1939.

The facade reminds similar tenements built in Dworcowa Street 45/47 in 1905/1906. Yet, here, architectural details lean on more simplicity in the making and the shape, with less Art Nouveau motifs.

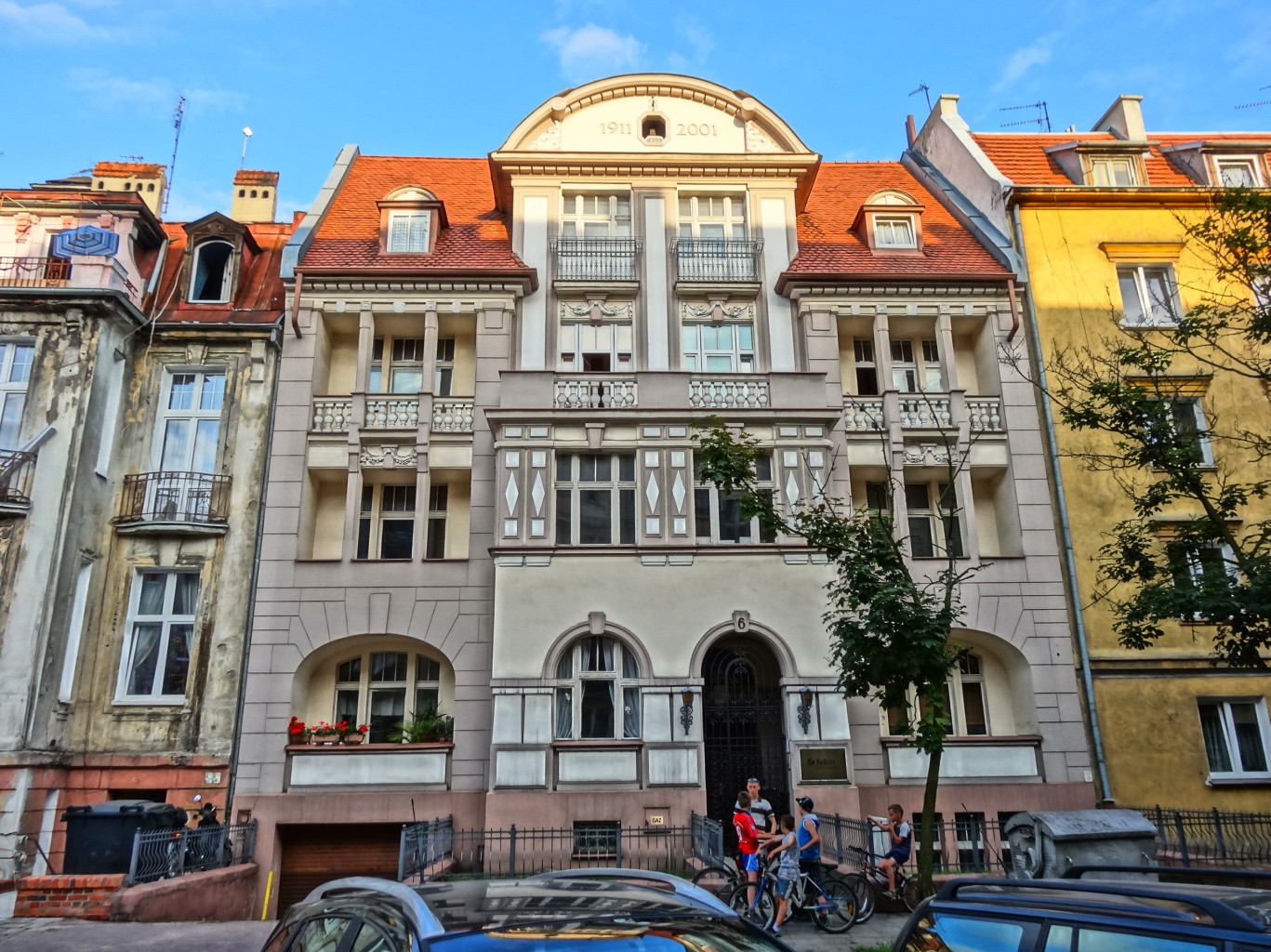
Facade on the street

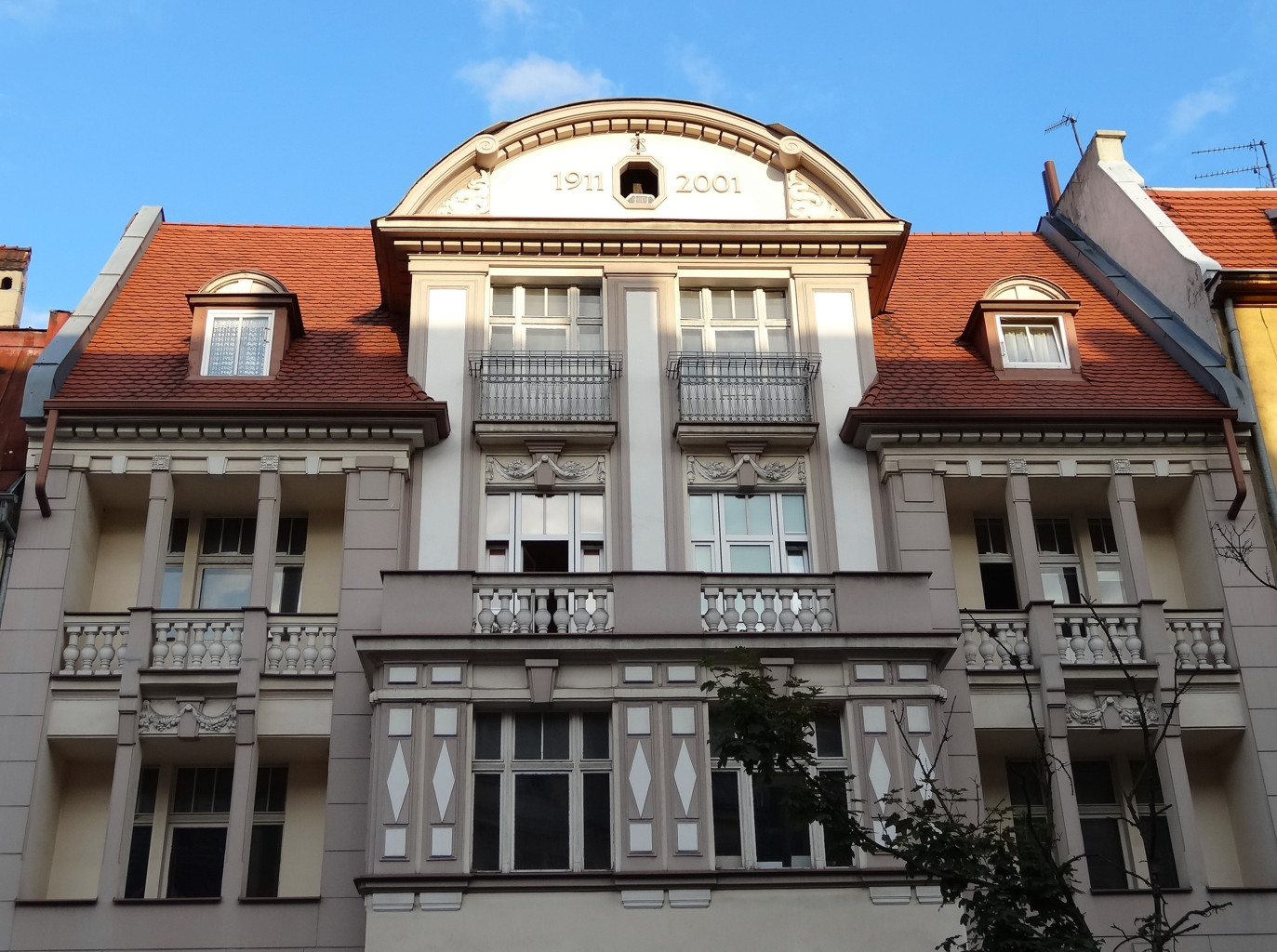
Upper balconies

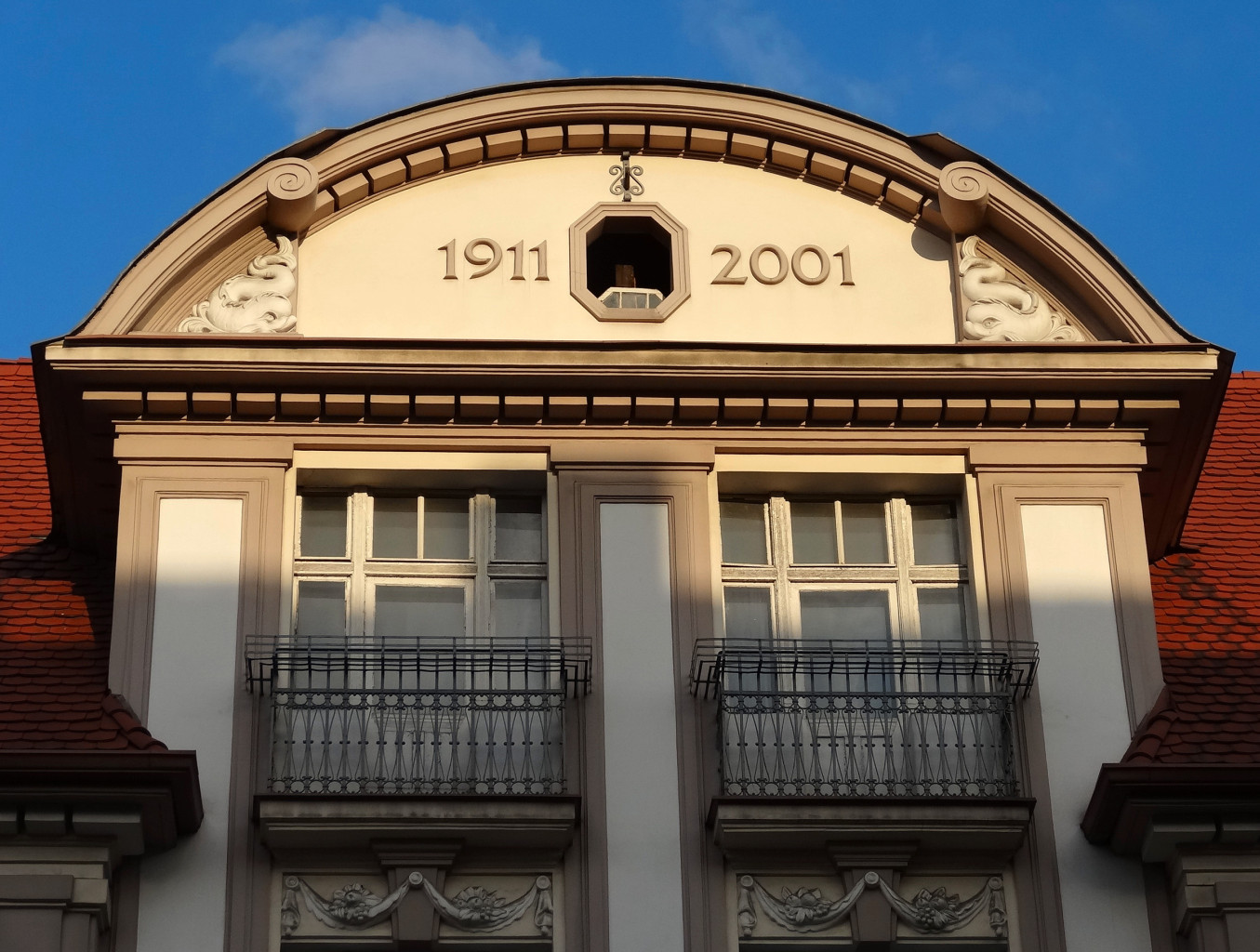
Detail of the pediment

=== Alfred Schleusener House at 7 ===
ca 1909 by Alfred Schleusener

Eclecticism

Built in 1909, as mentioned on the top of the elevation, Alfred Schleusener is the first registered owner in the 1910s. Schleusener was an active designer and builder in Bromberg/Bydgoszcz in the first half of the 20th century. In the 1920s, Bronisław Kentzer (1880–1939) lived there: a successful businessman of the city, he owned, among others, the "Kentzer's Mill", now the "Słoneczny Młyn" Hotel at 96 Jagiellońska Street.

The villa reflects architectural tendencies on the fringe between Art Nouveau and early modernism.

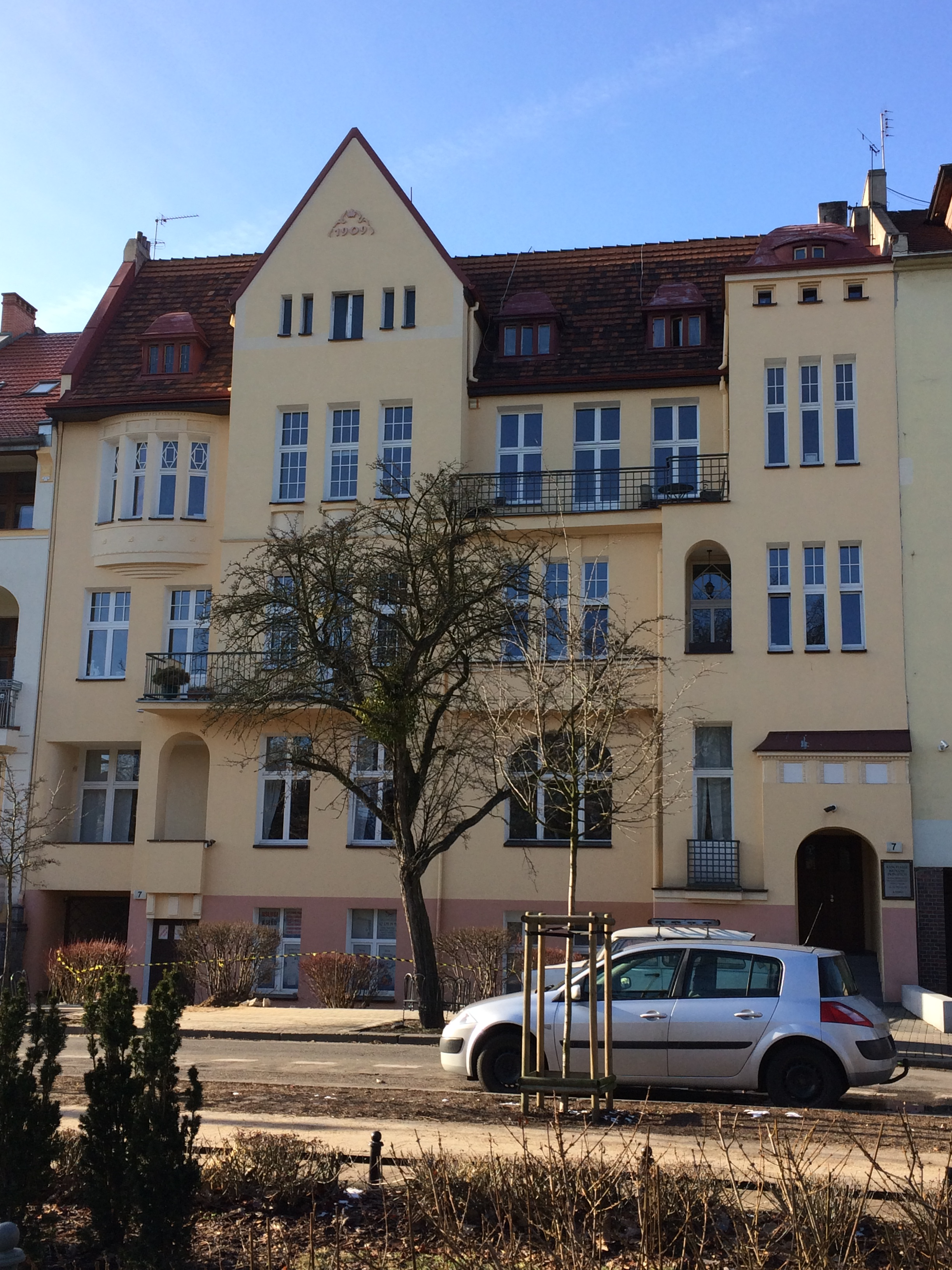
Main elevation

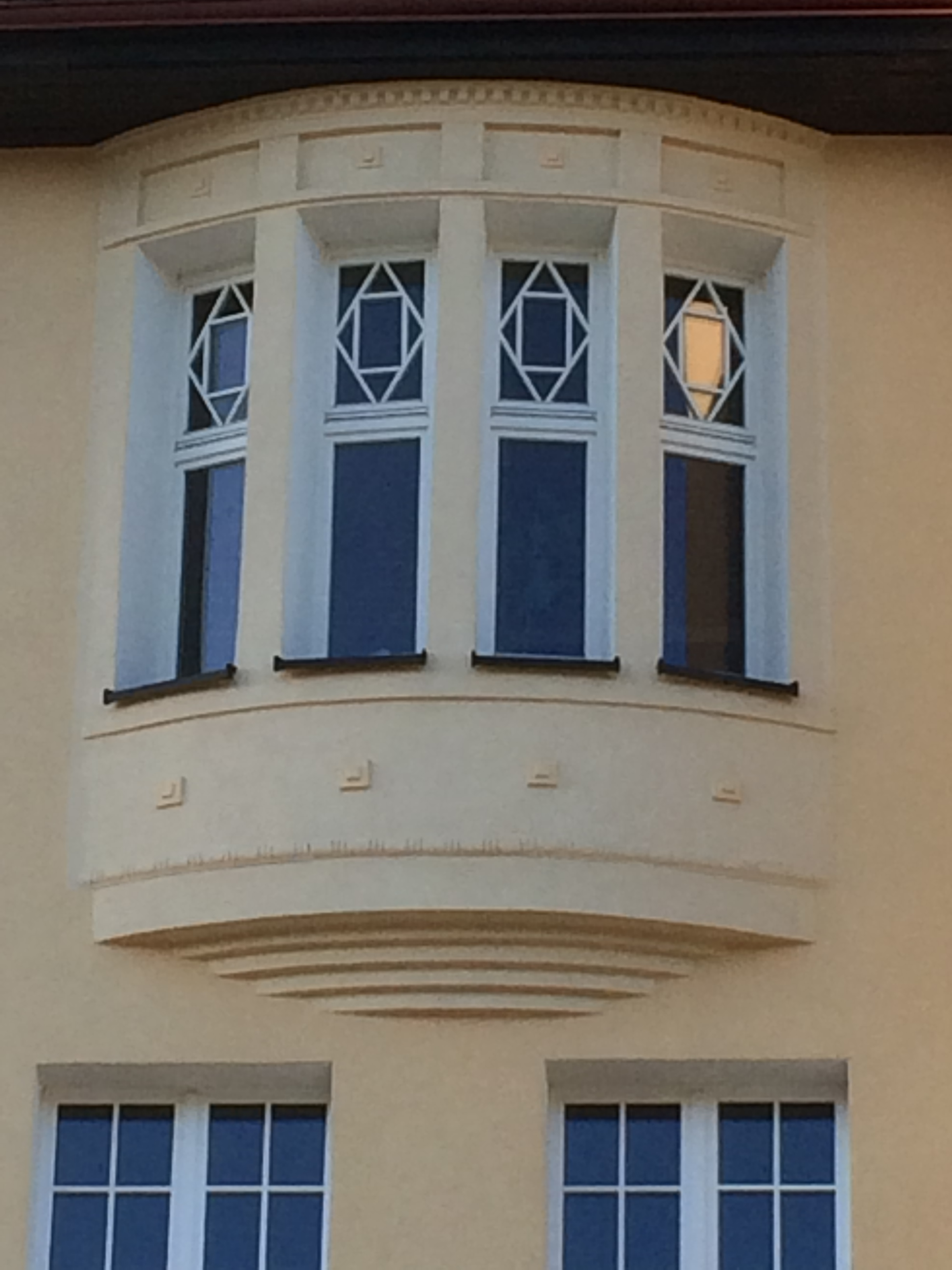
Bow window

=== Dr Graeupner's House at 8 ===
1906–1907, Emil and Georg Zillmann

Art Nouveau

This edifice has been commissioned by Dr Max Graeupner to Emil and Georg Zillmann, architects from Charlottenburg. It had been accommodating Max Graeupner's clinic, specialized in Women's diseases and obstetrics (German: frauenkrankheiten und geburtshilfe). He lived at Dantsiger straße 38, today's Gdańska Street 63. After First World War, the building was still used as a medical facility, run by Dr Gliński.

During the occupation, the house was the seat of the SA, the paramilitary units of the Nazi Party.

Many elements can be highlighted: a series of floral motifs in the pediments and in cartouches, or the balconies wrought iron fences, as well as the characteristic Art Nouveau waved lines in the decoration of the street door.

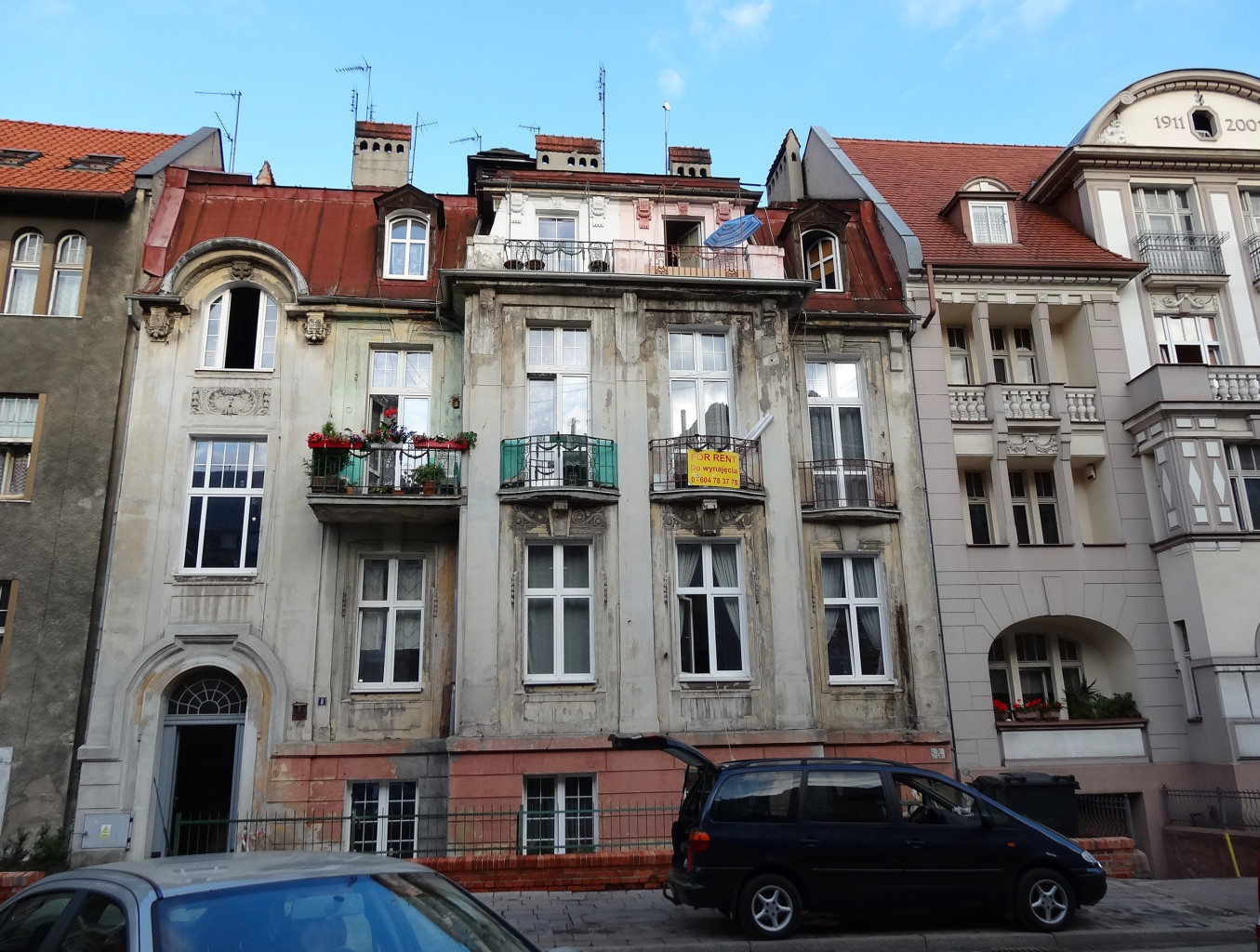
Facade on the street

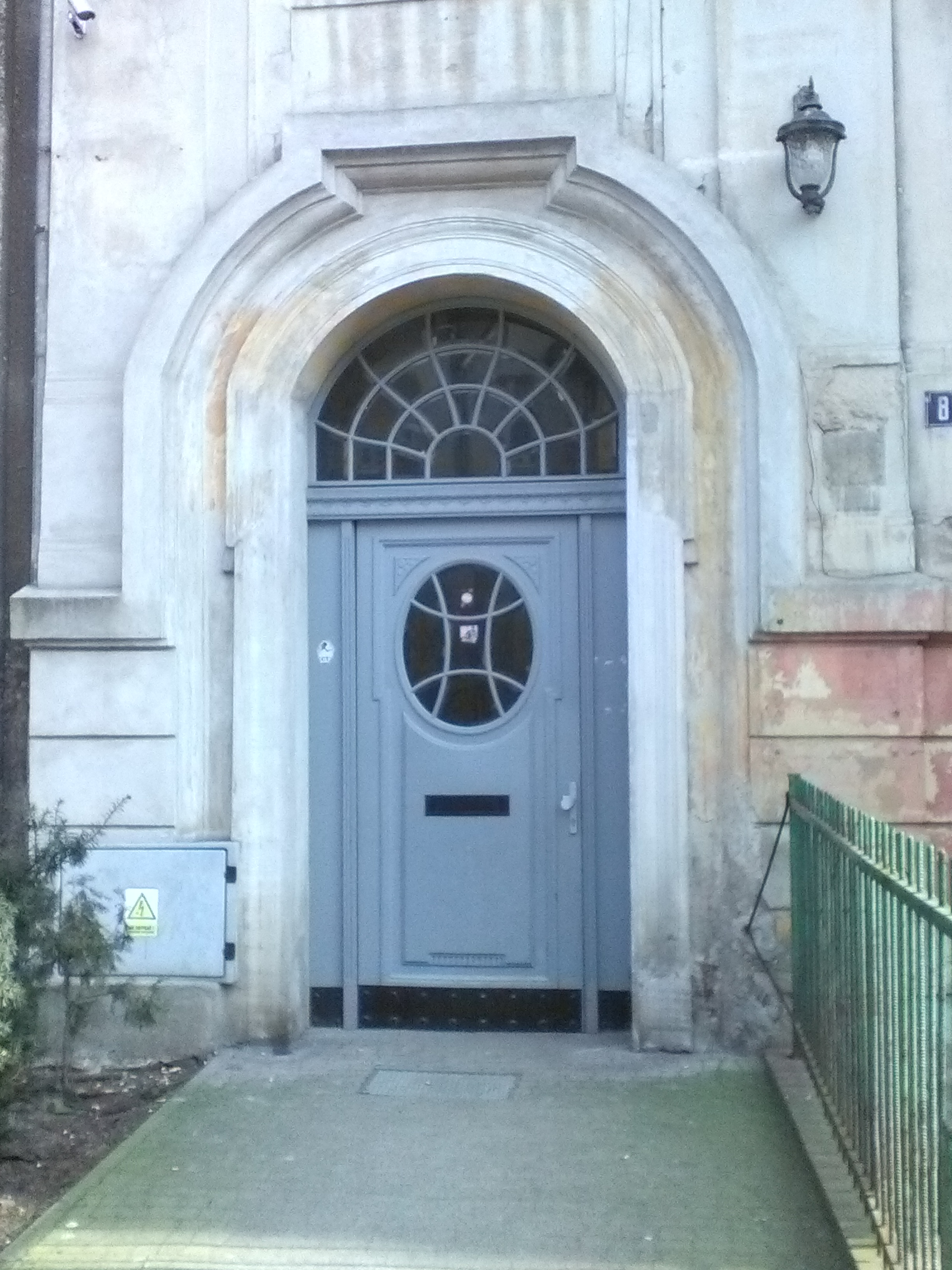
Portal

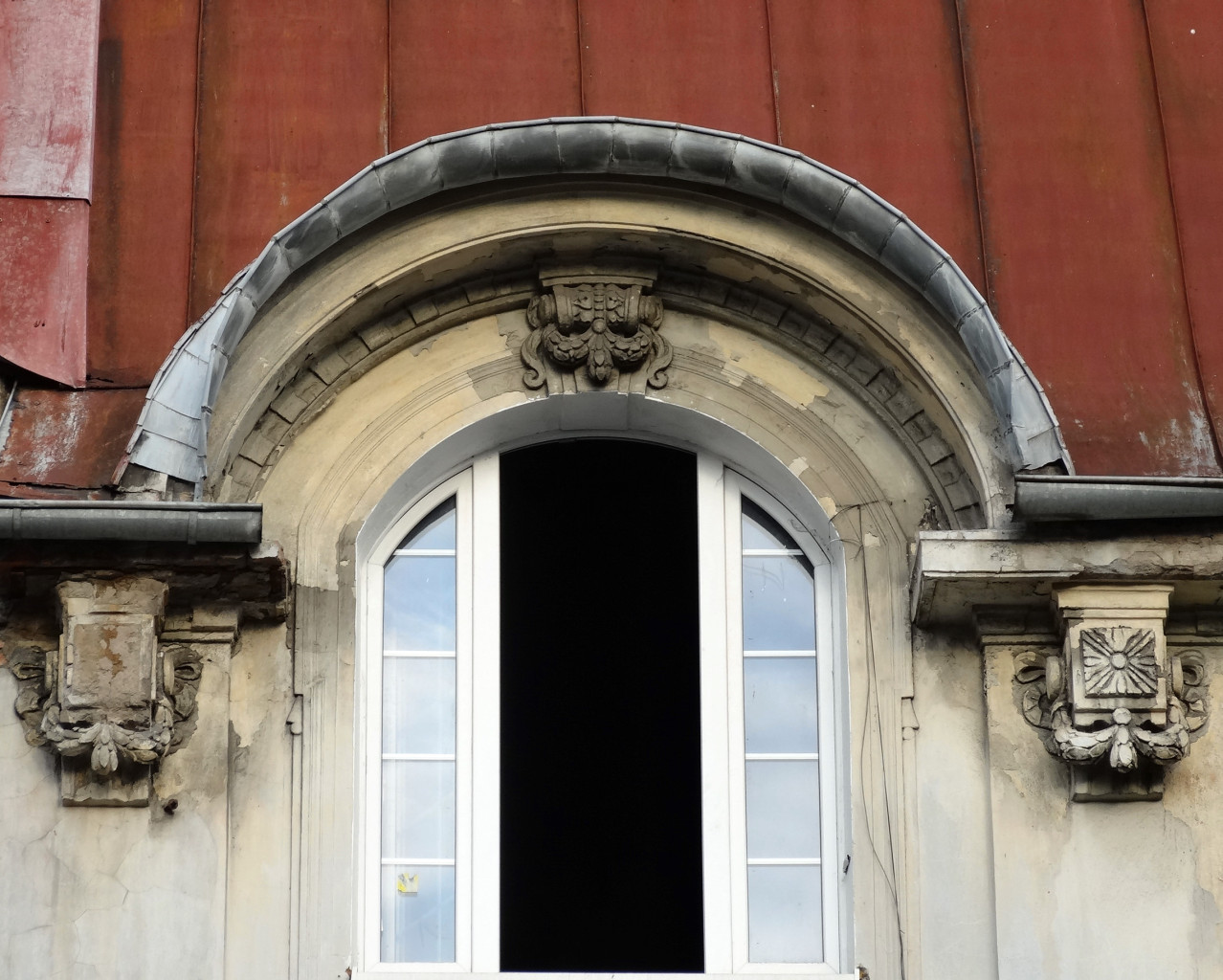
Architectural details

=== Tenement at 9 ===
1936-1938

Modern architecture, by Jan Kossowski

In the 1970s and 1980s, the tenement housed the Pomeranian Branch of the Polish Press Agency (Polish: Polska Agencja Prasowa-PAP], headed for many years by the poet Kazimierz Hoffman from Bydgoszcz.

Like many other buildings in downtown Bydgoszcz (7 Plac Wolności, 14 Kopernika Street, 11 Ossoliński Alley), this edifice is an additional and accurate instance of Polish modernism of the interwar period.

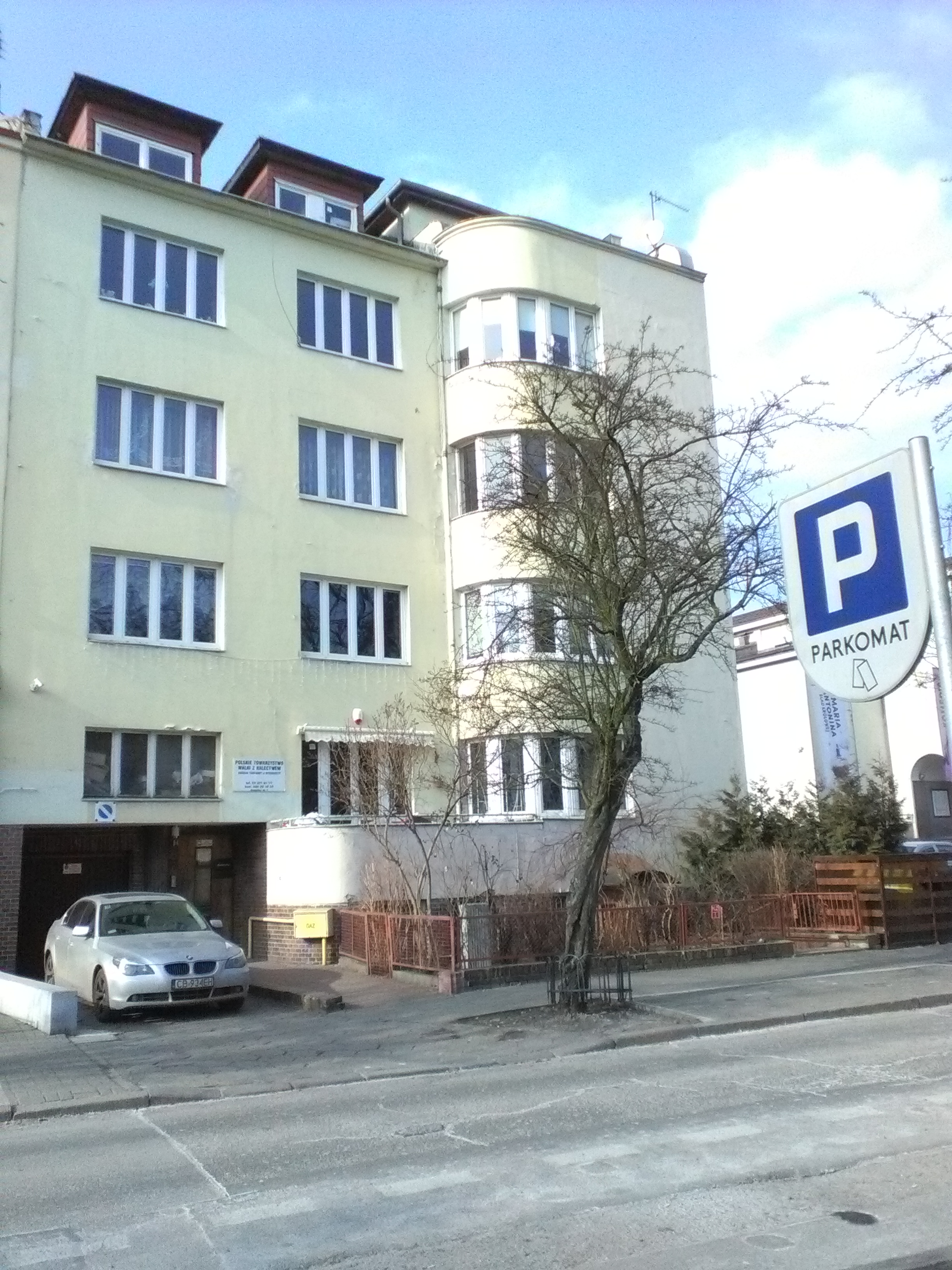
Facade on the street

=== Tenement at 10/12 ===
ca 1906, by Paul Böhm

Early Modern architecture

On the 1908 Bromberg's address book, Paul Böhm was listed as the first owner of this vast building. Paul Böhm was a prolific architect and designer in Bromberg, between the 1880s and the 1910s.

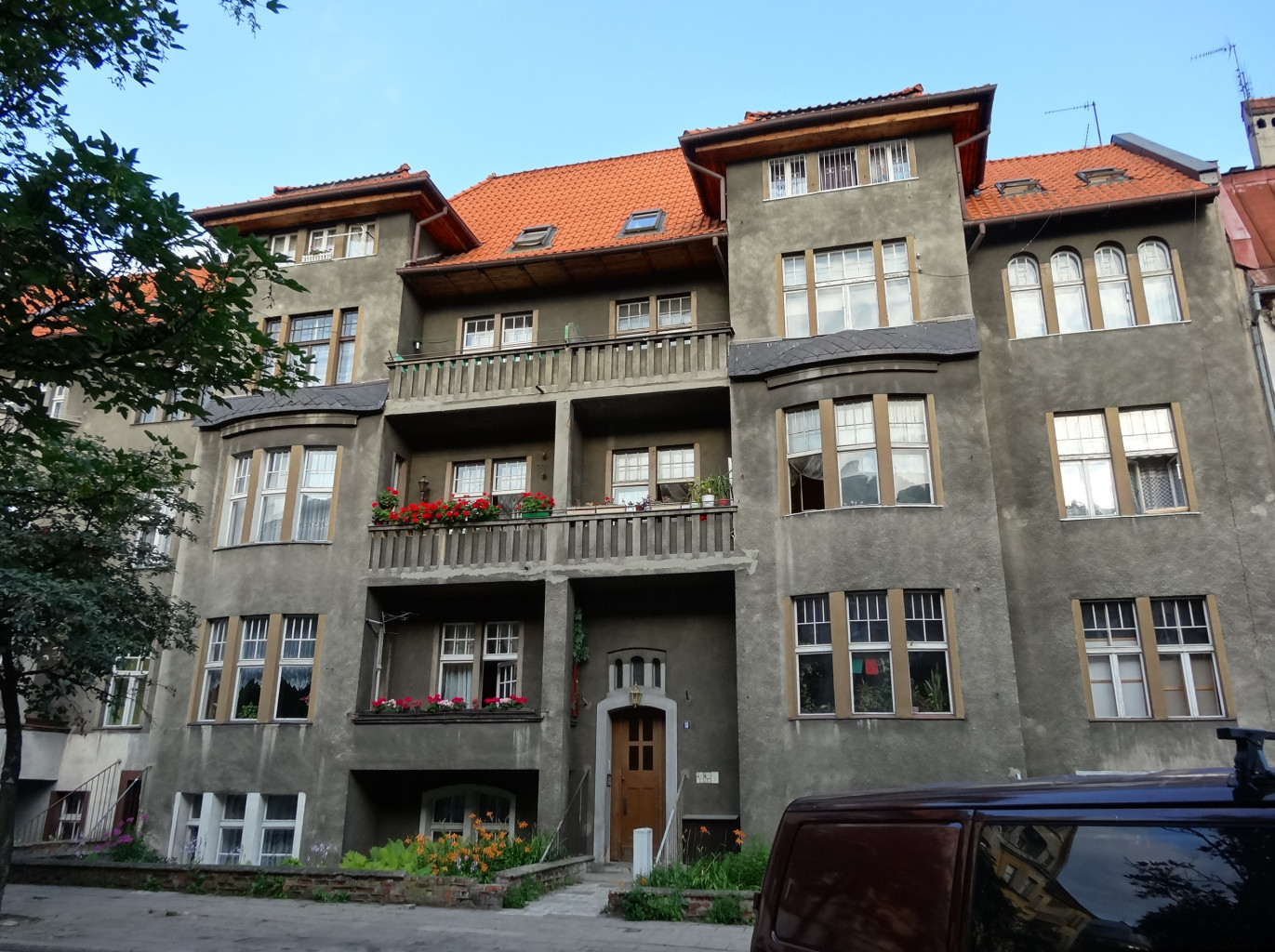
Facade on the street

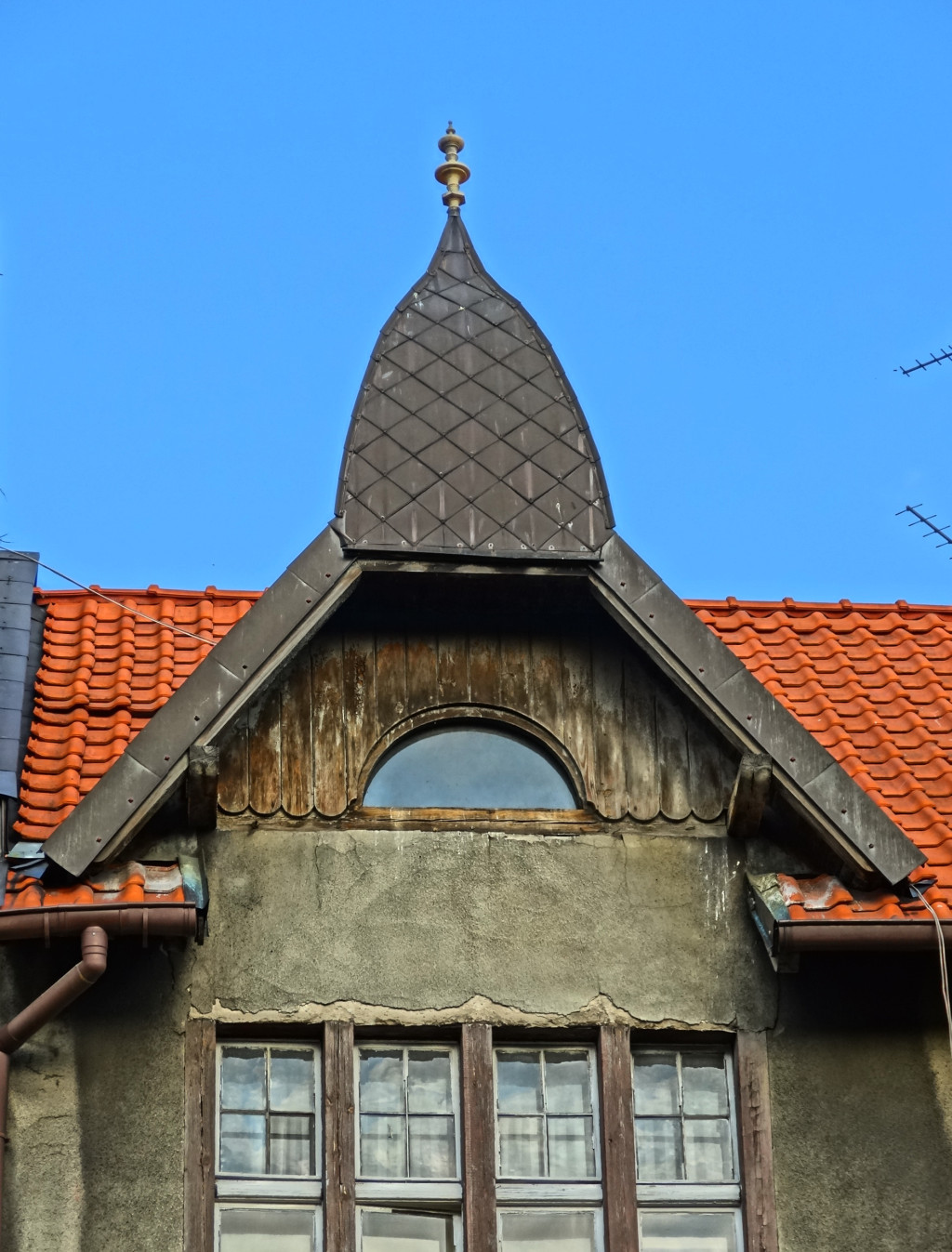
Detail of the gable top

=== Polish Theatre in Bydgoszcz, at 2 Adam Mickiewicz Alley, corner with 20 Sycznia 1920 street ===
1948–1949, by Alfons Licznerski

Modern architecture

Hieronim Konieczka Polish Theatre in Bydgoszcz is the largest and best known theatre of the city. Its current director is Paweł Wodziński.

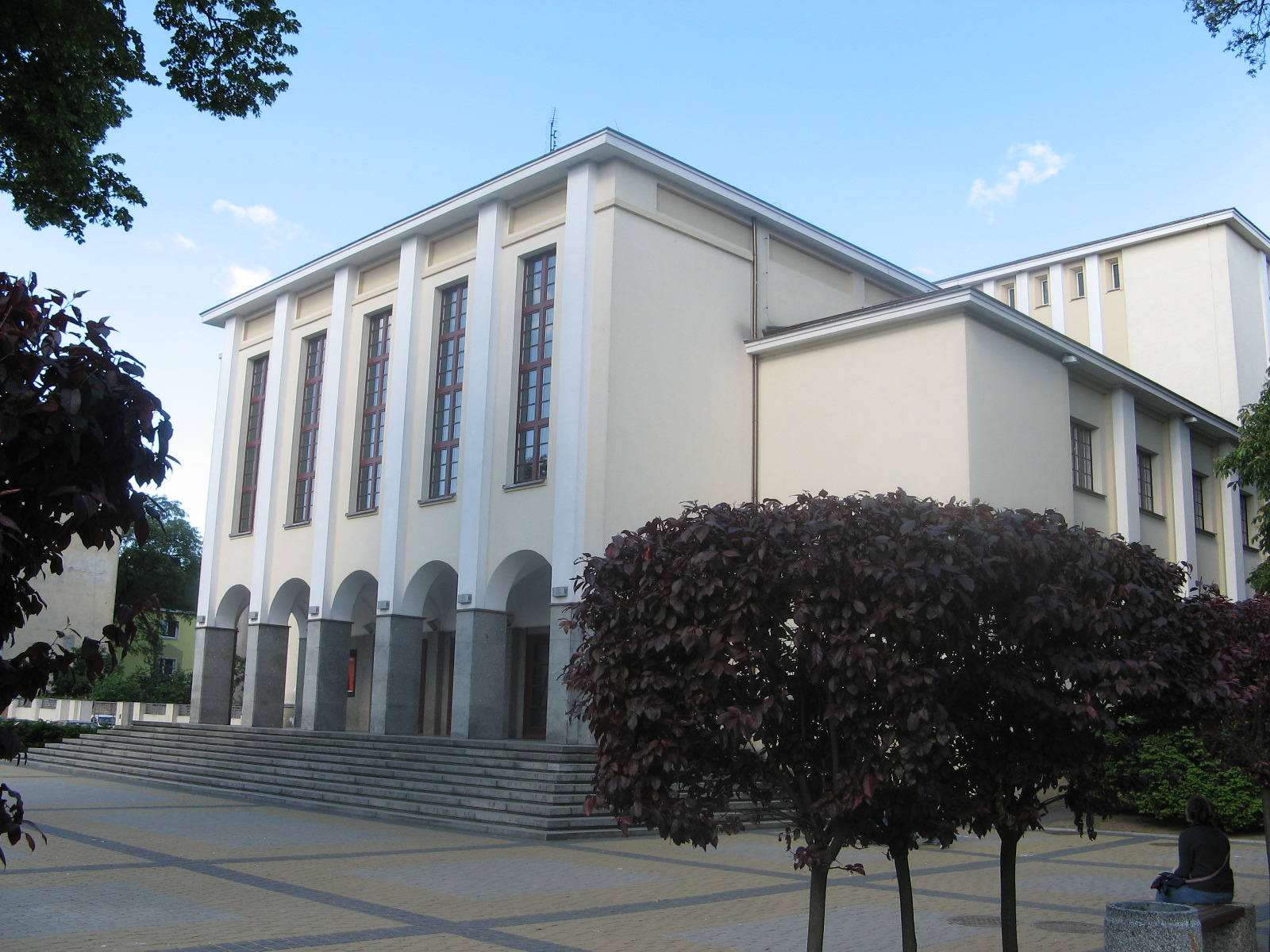
View from Mickiewicz Alley

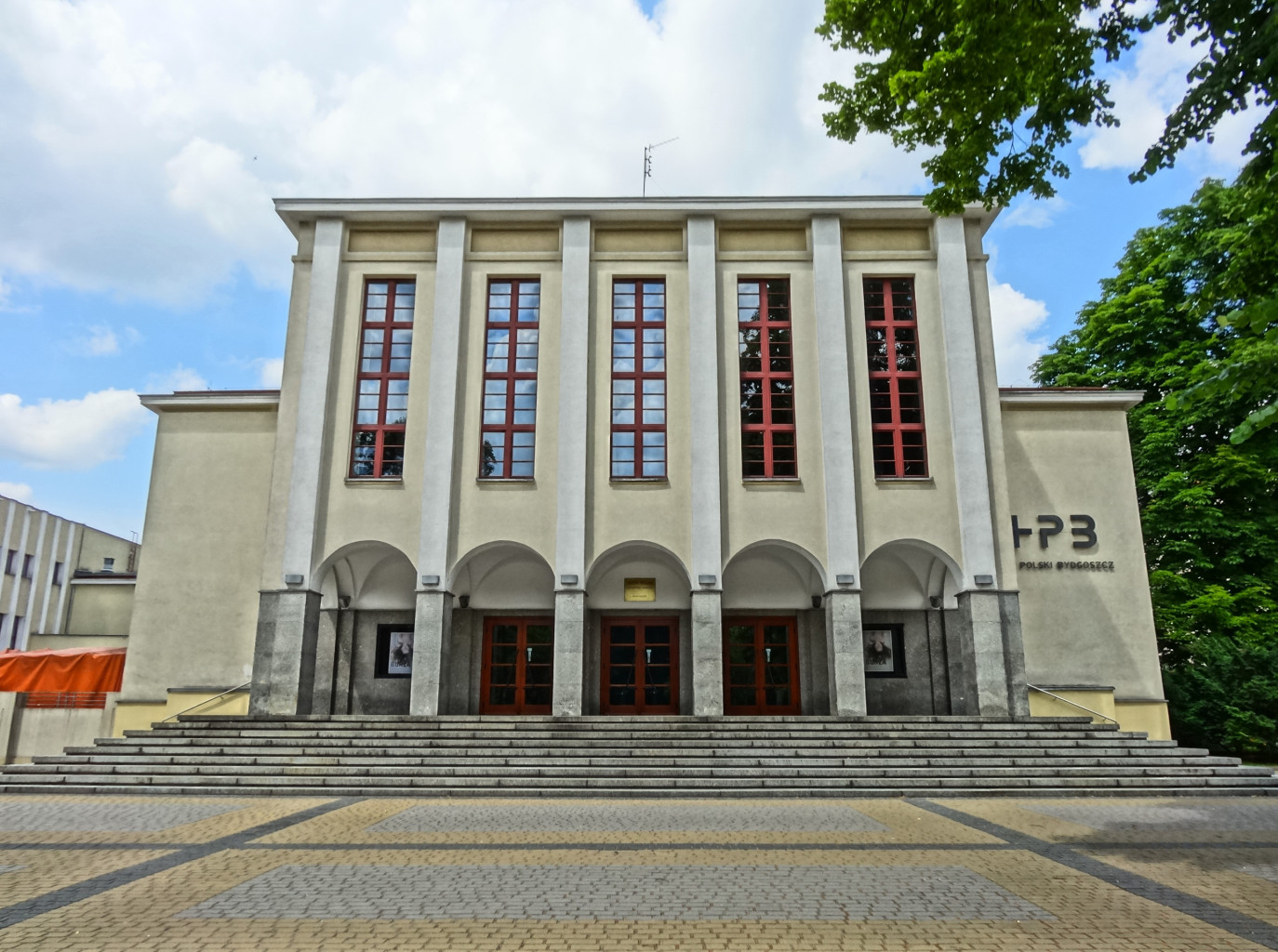
Main entry

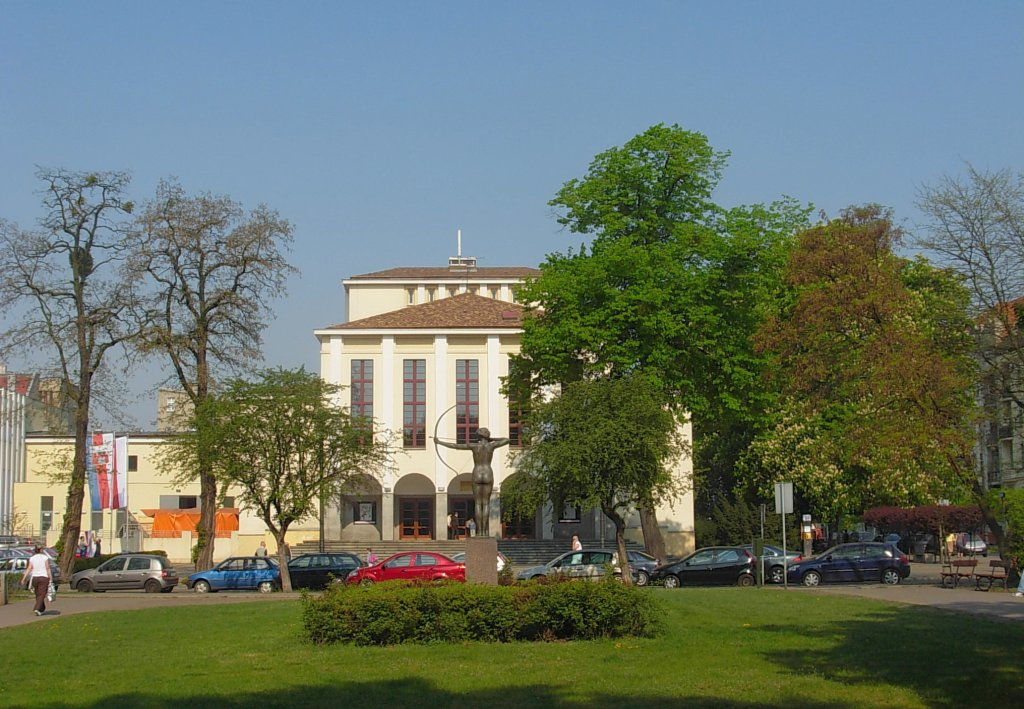
View from Jan Kochanowski Park

=== Petrikowski Tenement at 14, corner with Zamoyskiego street ===
1906–1907, by Victor Petrikowski

Art Nouveau

This tenement from 1906 had as first landlord Victor Petrikowski, a carpenter and a construction entrepreneur who designed the current building. In this house lived Edward Woyniłłowicz, a Polish and Belarusian social and economic activist, who left his eastern lands to dwell in Bydgoszcz. He wrote there his memoirs, Wspomnienia 1847-1928.

The edifice has been thoroughly renovated in 2015, preserving its historic Art Nouveau architectural details, alongside its specific decorated interiors (staircase, ornaments and stained glass).

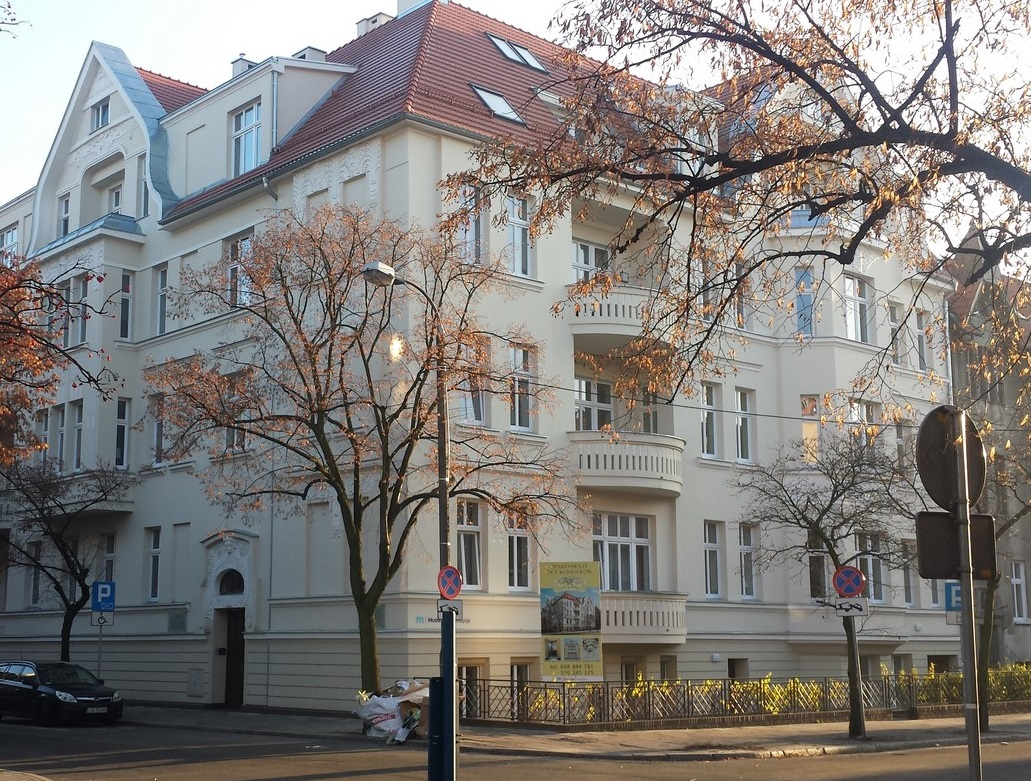
Facades seen from street crossing

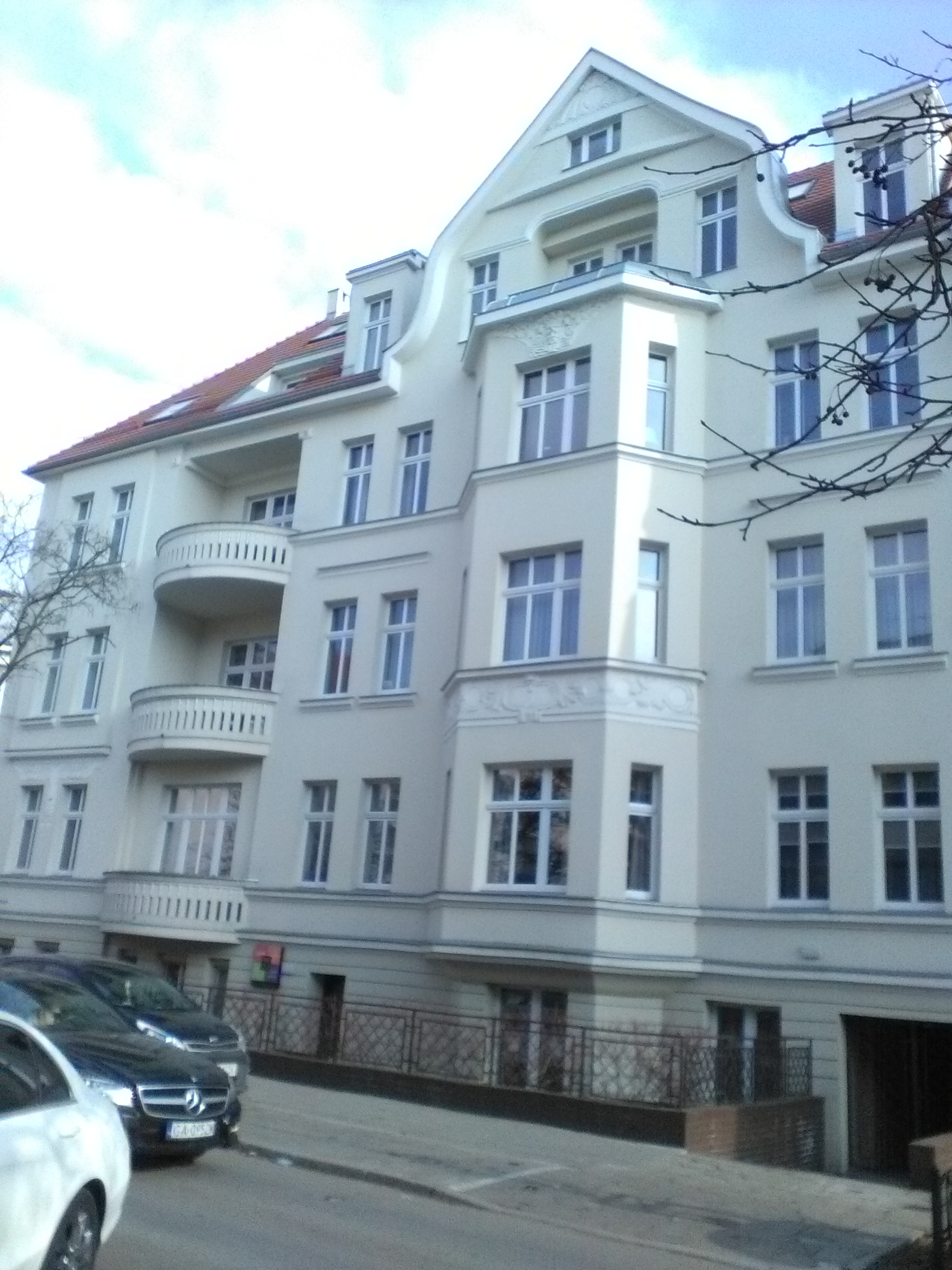
Frontage on 20 Stycznia 1920

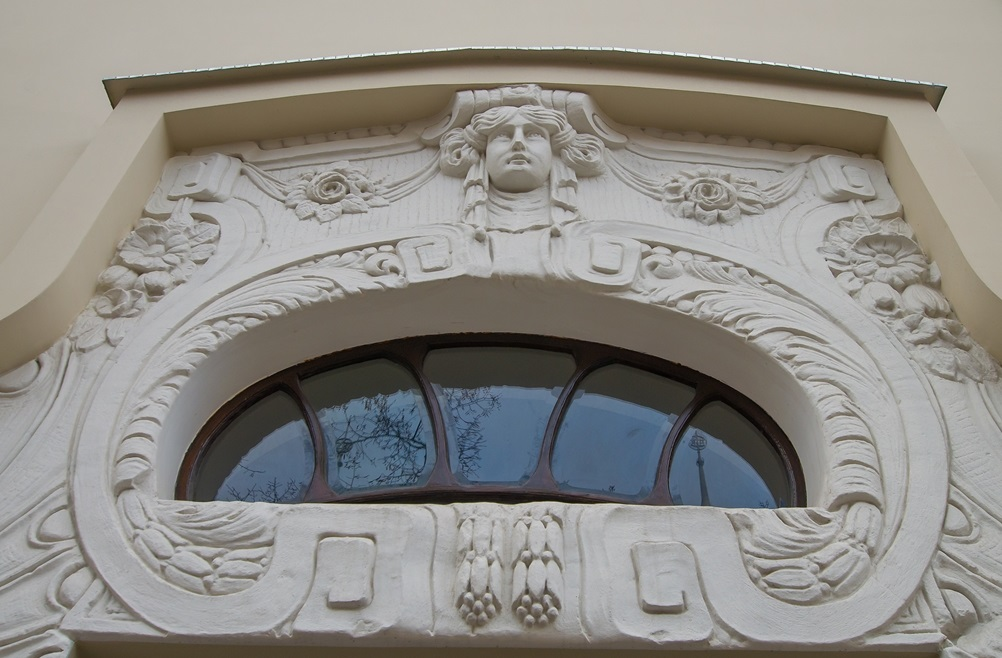
Art Nouveau transom light

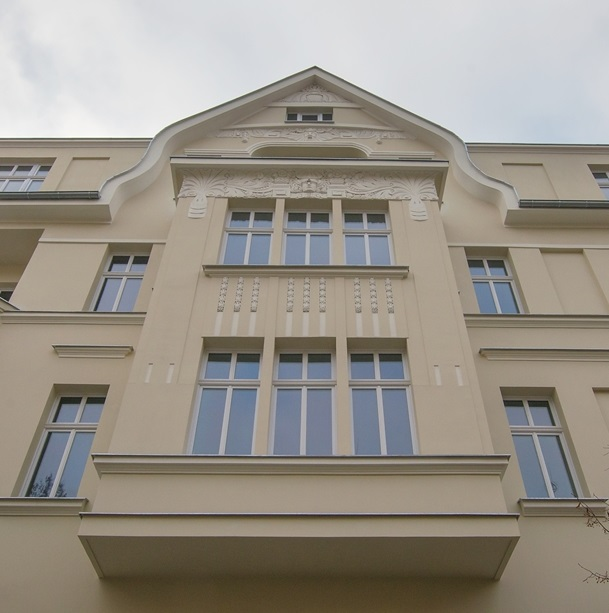
Bay window

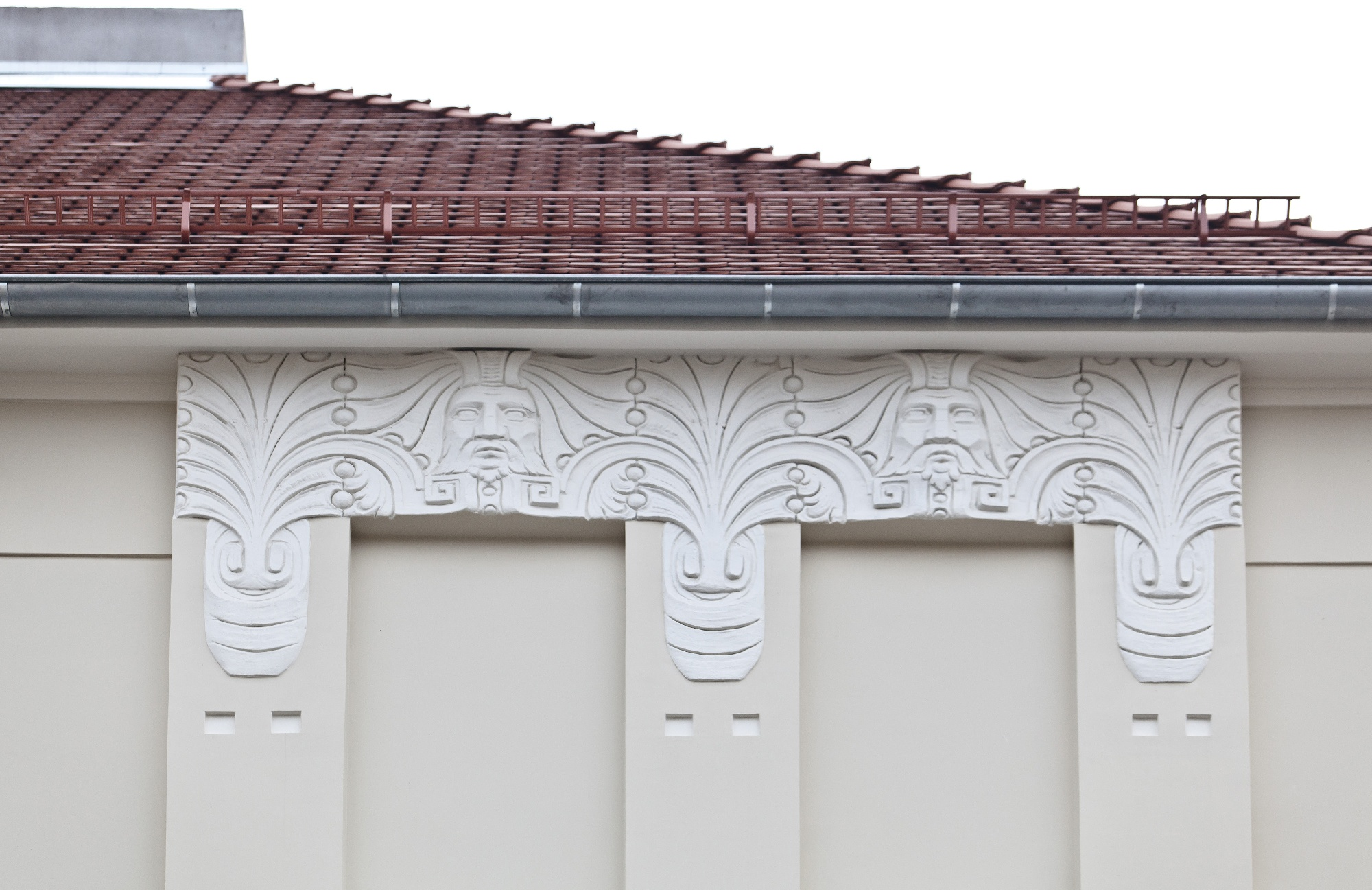
Art Nouveau motifs

=== Rudolf Kern tenement at 16, corner with Zamoyskiego street ===
Registered on Kuyavian-Pomeranian Voivodeship heritage list, Nr.A/1628/1-2 (February 25,)

1910, by Rudolf Kern

Art Nouveau

The building was first the property and abode of Rudolf Kern, the architect who designed.

This immense edifice, at the crossing with Zamoyskiego street, reveals a large metal roof studded with a corner finial, dormers, a terrace crowning the avant-corps which bottom is pierced by arches to make room for the majestic main entry area. The portal arch is covered on the inside with coffers and displays the oval-shaped openings specific to Art Nouveau design.

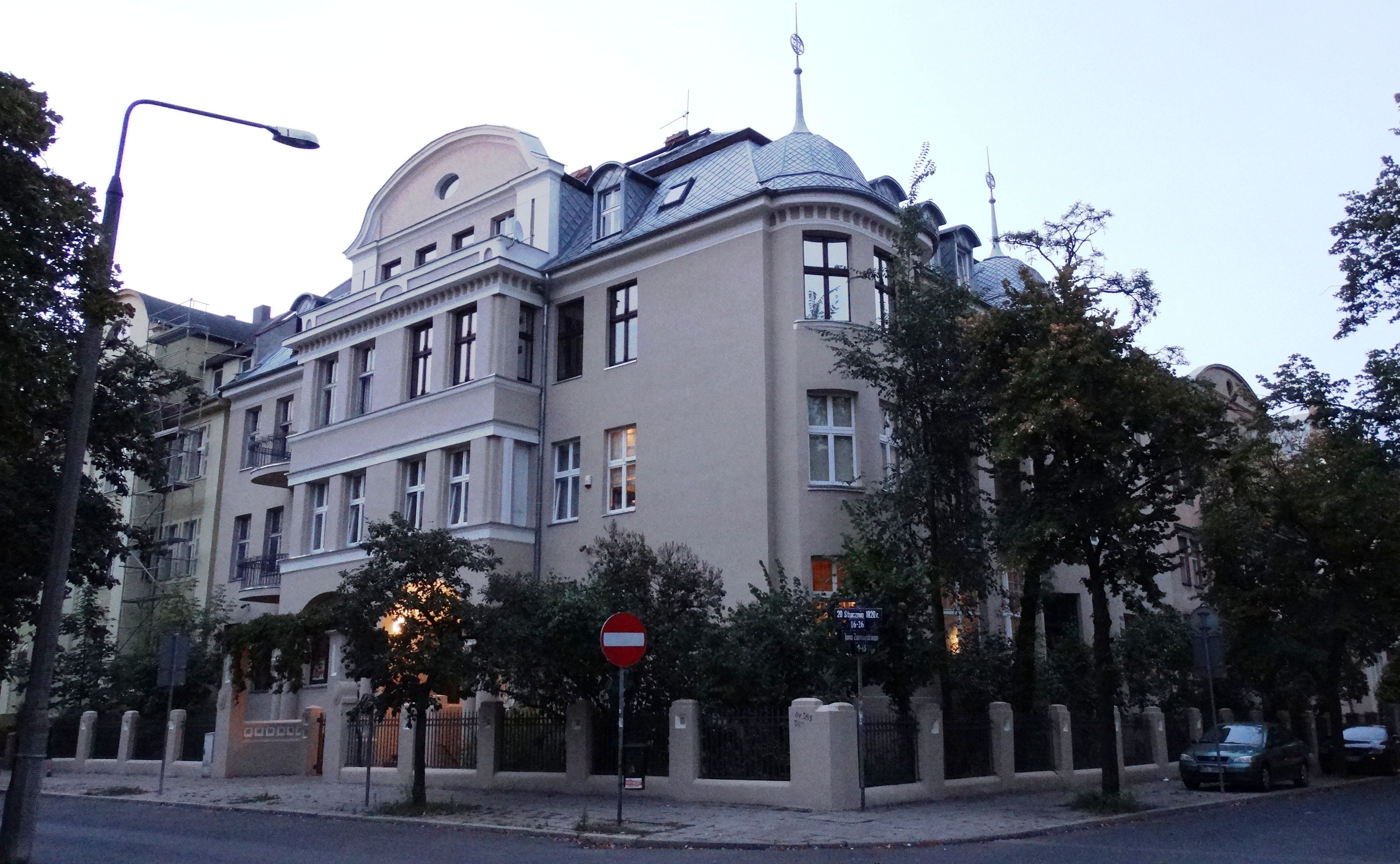
Facades seen from street crossing

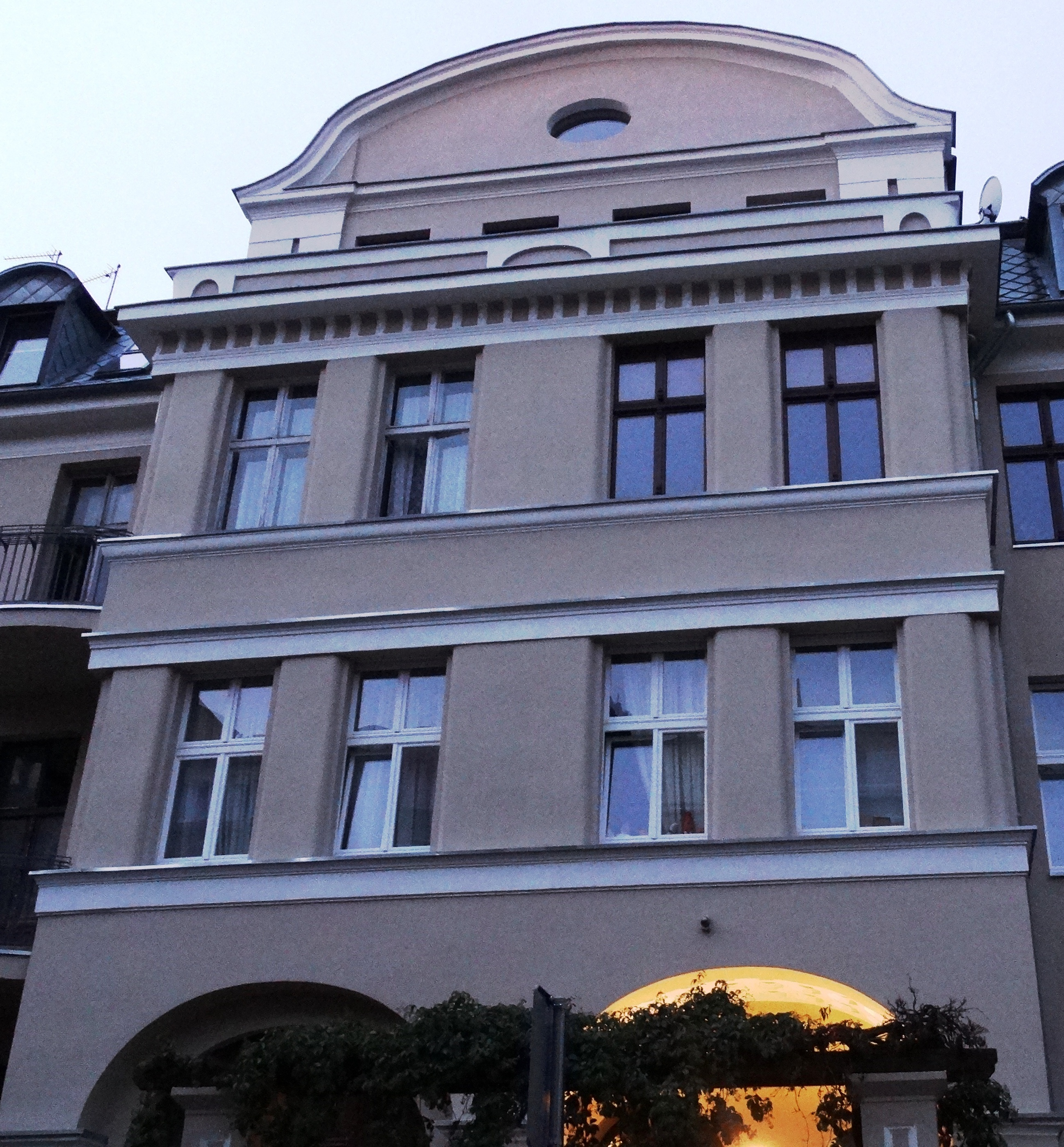
Avant-corps

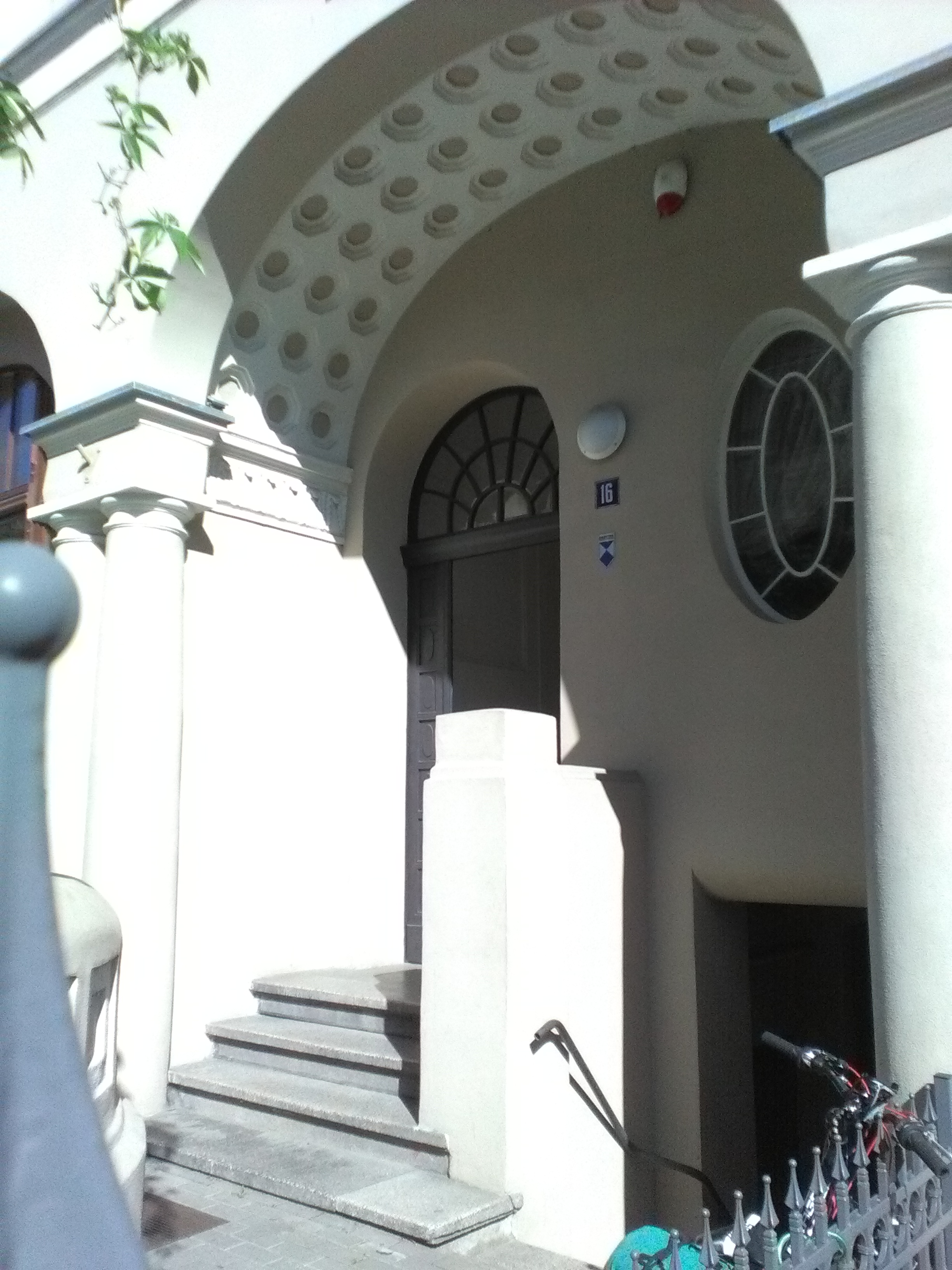
Adorned portal after renovation

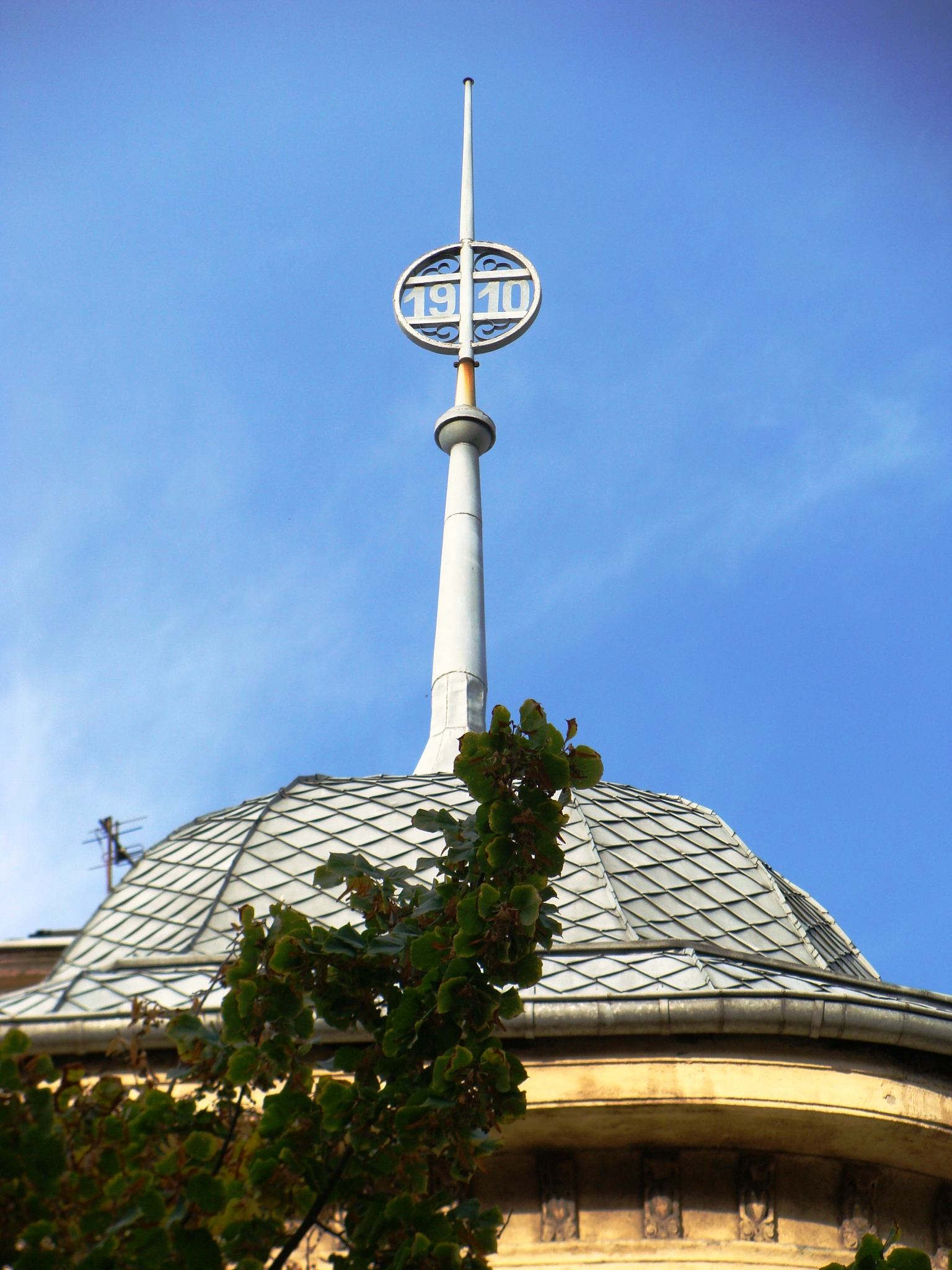
Finial

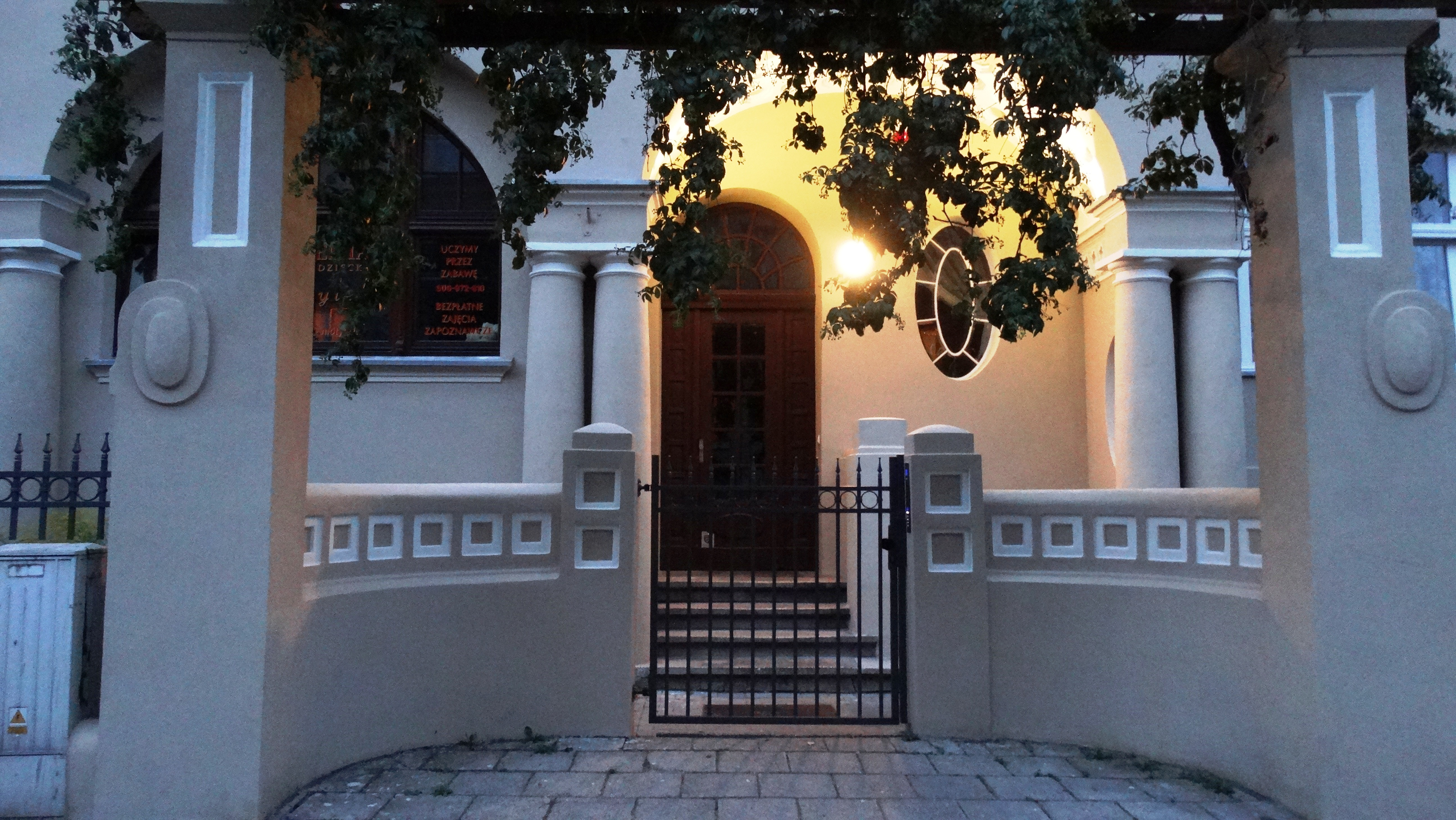
Renovated portal

=== Tenement at 17, corner with Adam Mickiewicz Alley ===
Registered on Kuyavian-Pomeranian Voivodeship heritage list, Nr.601456-Reg.A/1080/1-2 (December 20, 1994)

1905–1906, by Paul Böhm

Art Nouveau

Paul Böhm, designer, was also the first owner of the tenement, which was split into renting flats.

This corner building is characterised by its towering peak topped with a metal roof. At street level, the fence is adorned with animal figures (rooster, owl, fish).

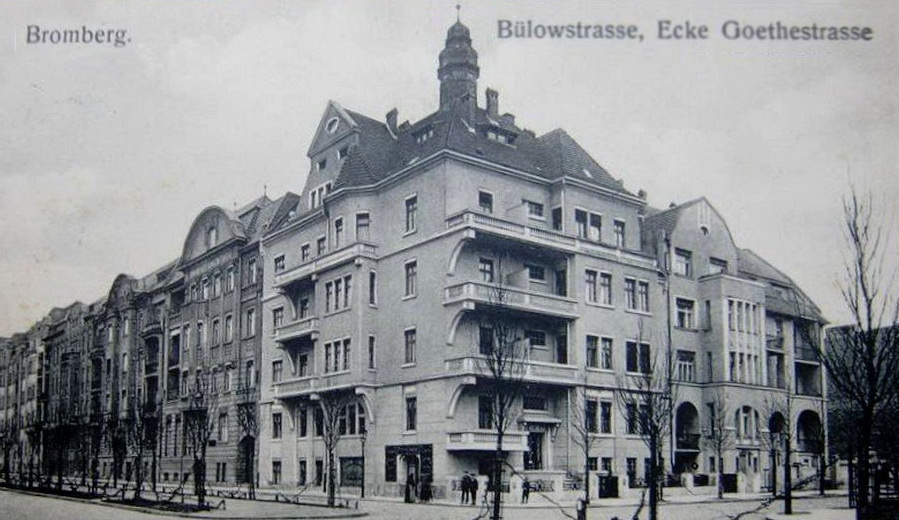
View ca 1914

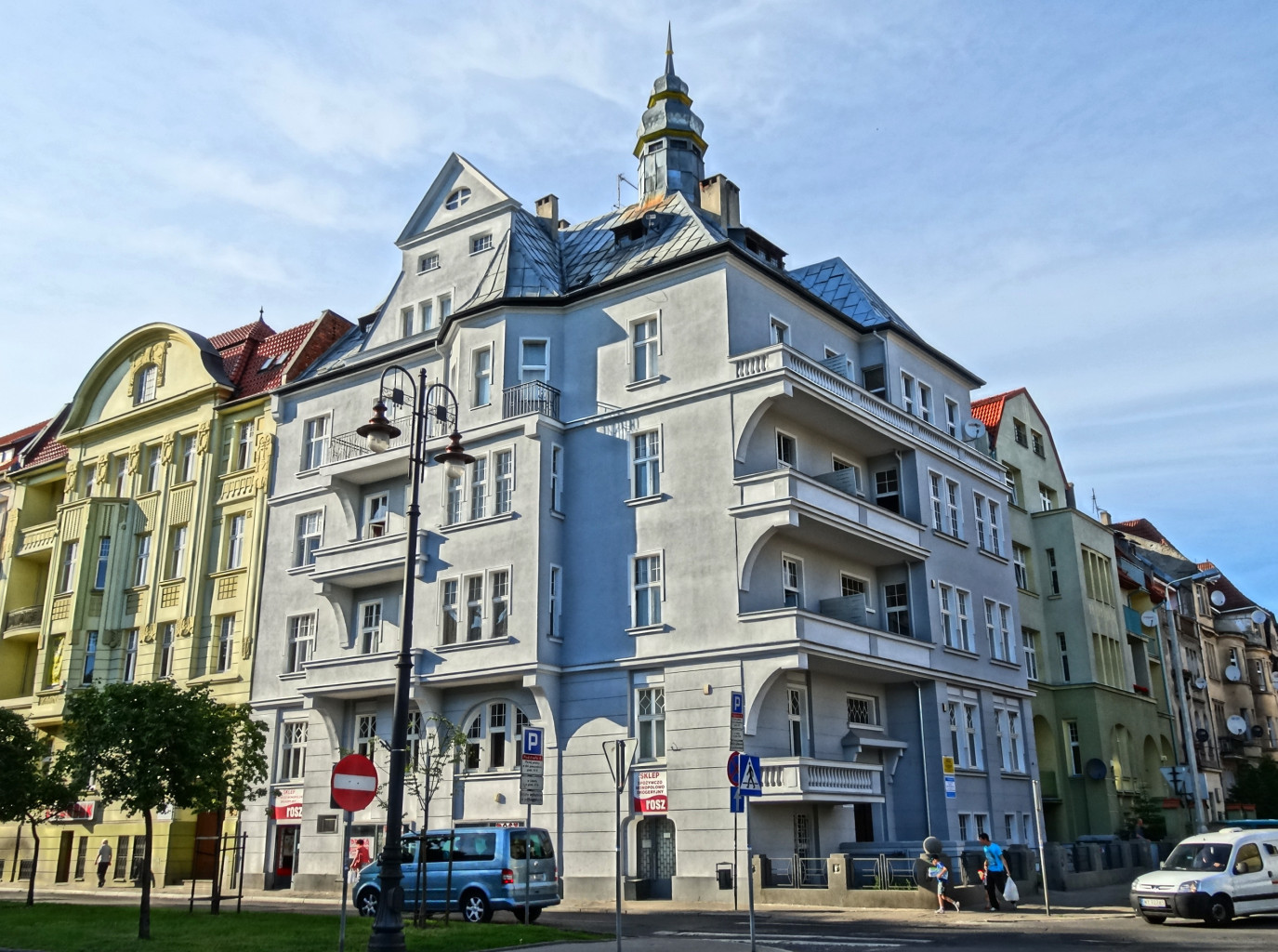
General view of both frontages

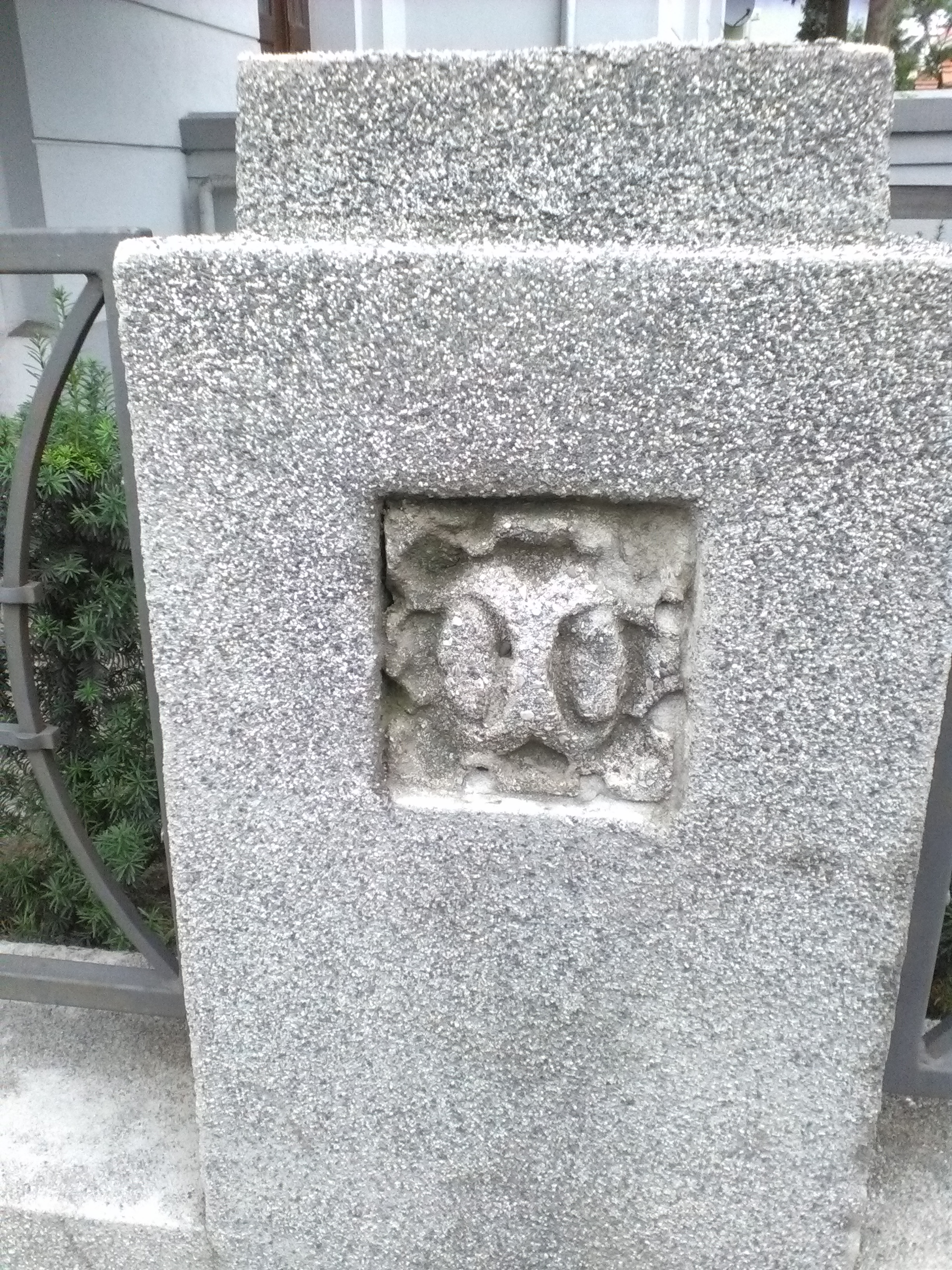
Fish head figure on the fence

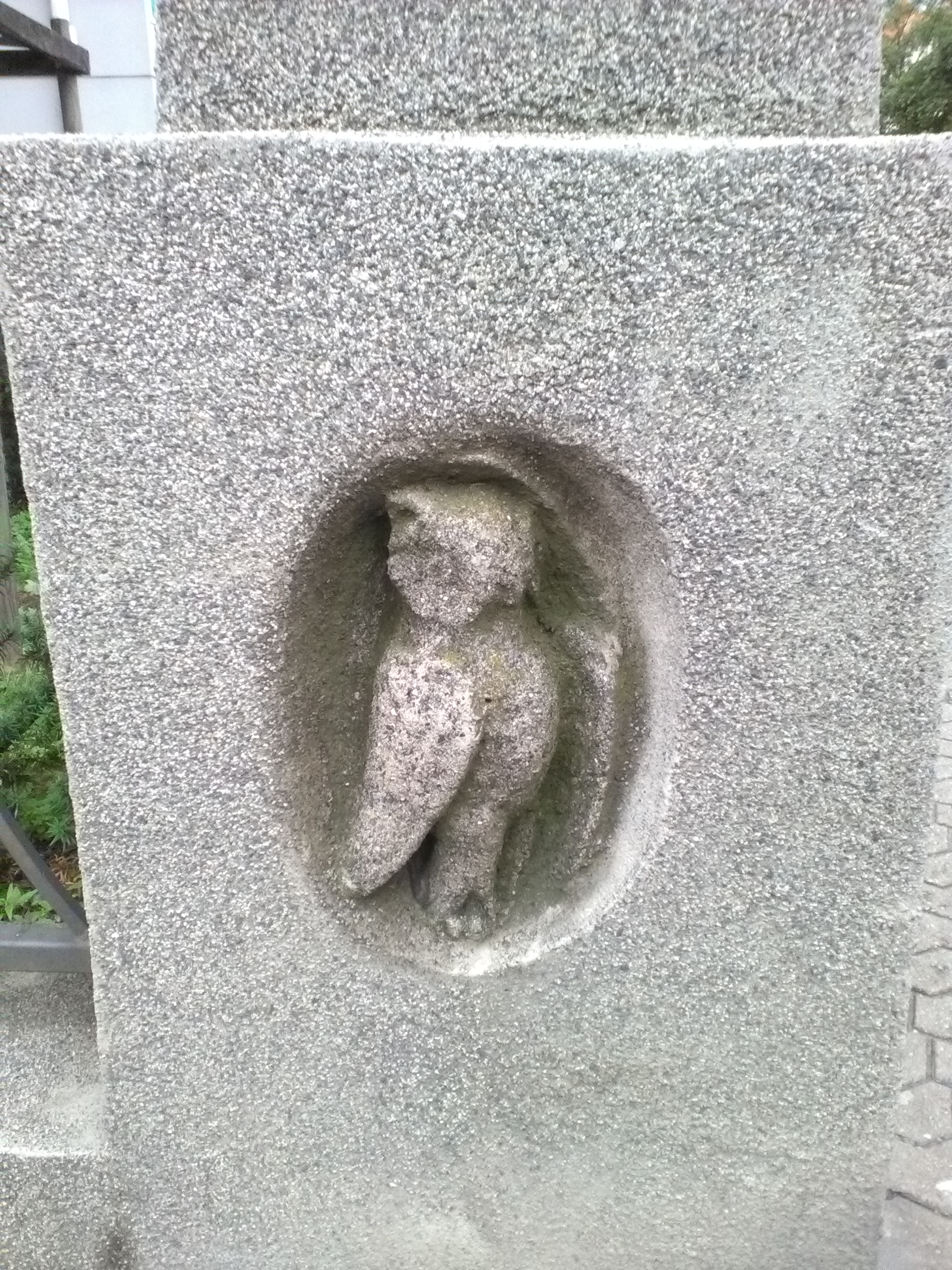
Owl figure

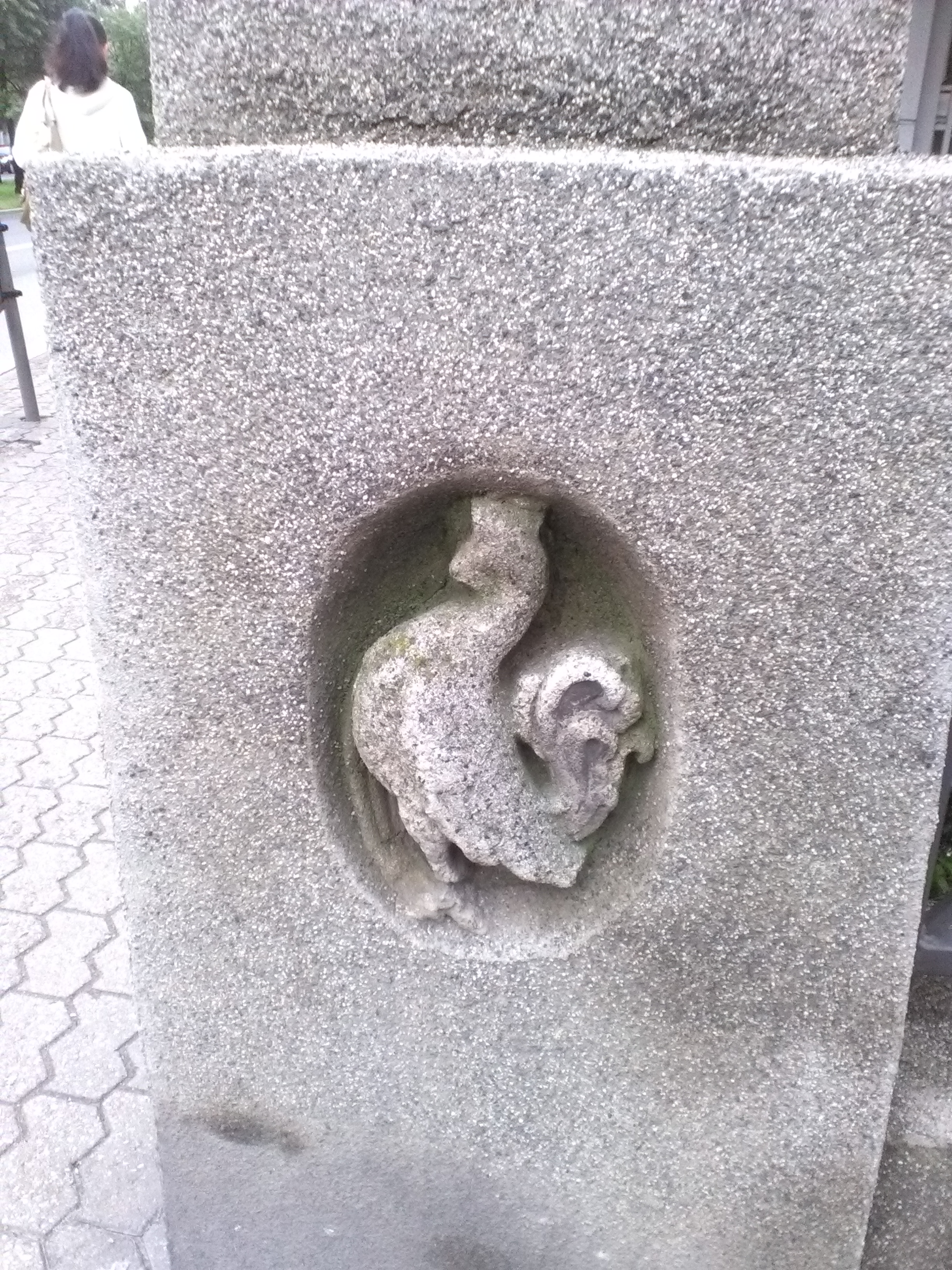
Rooster silhouette

=== Tenement at 18 ===
1911, by Rudolf Kern

Art Nouveau, elements of early modernism

The edifice at then Goethestraße 29 has been commissioned by a master mason, Mr Weiss. In the 1930s, young Zbigniew Raszewski (1925–1992), a future Polish writer and theatre historian, lived there with his family.

The elevation, renovated in 2017, reveals much of a transition of architectural styles common at this period of the 1910s, between early modernism and late Art Nouveau.

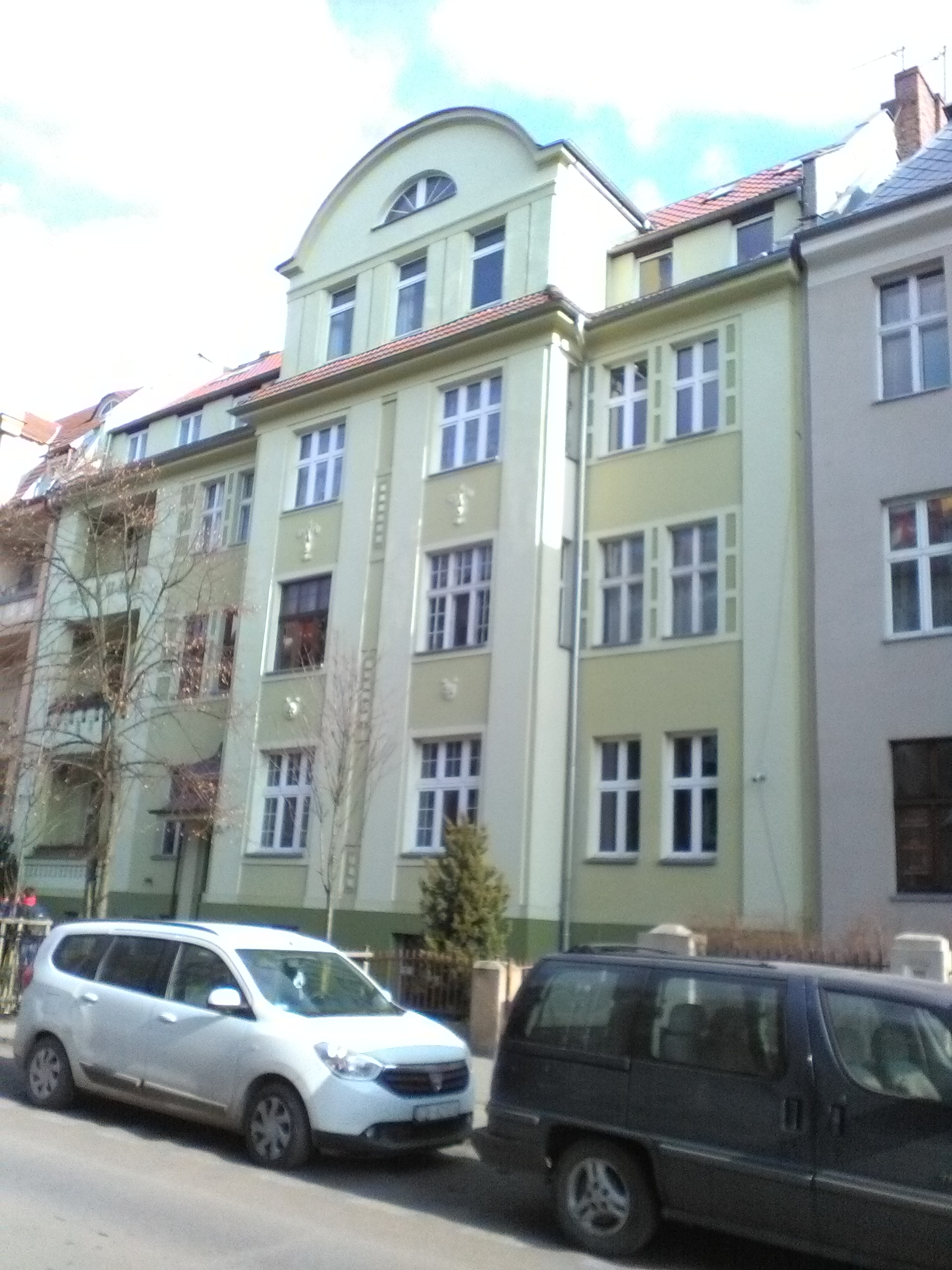
Refurbished facade

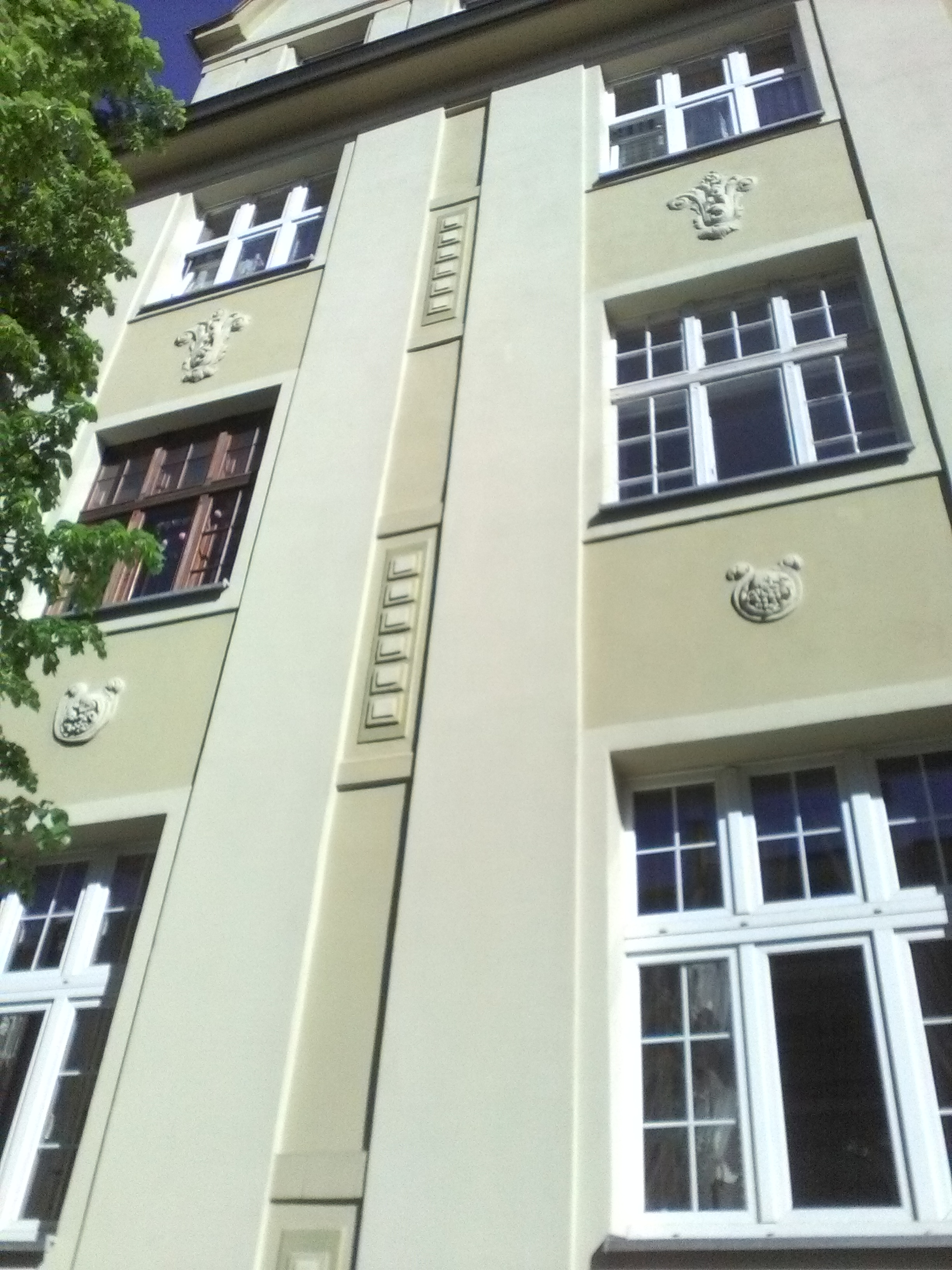
Detail of the frontage decoration

=== Tenement at 19 ===
1910, by Fritz Weidner

Art Nouveau, elements of early modernism

The initial owner, Richard Schramke, was a decorator. He tasked Fritz Weidner, a trendy Bromberg architect at that time, to realize a large building for renting purposes. The painter Bronisław Bartel lived there while working at the State School of Artistic Industry was a professor (1922-1926).

The unbalanced facade, peculiar to Art Nouveau style, is studded with balconies, avant-corps and loggias, but the absence of other detailed motifs challenges the uniformity of the ensemble.

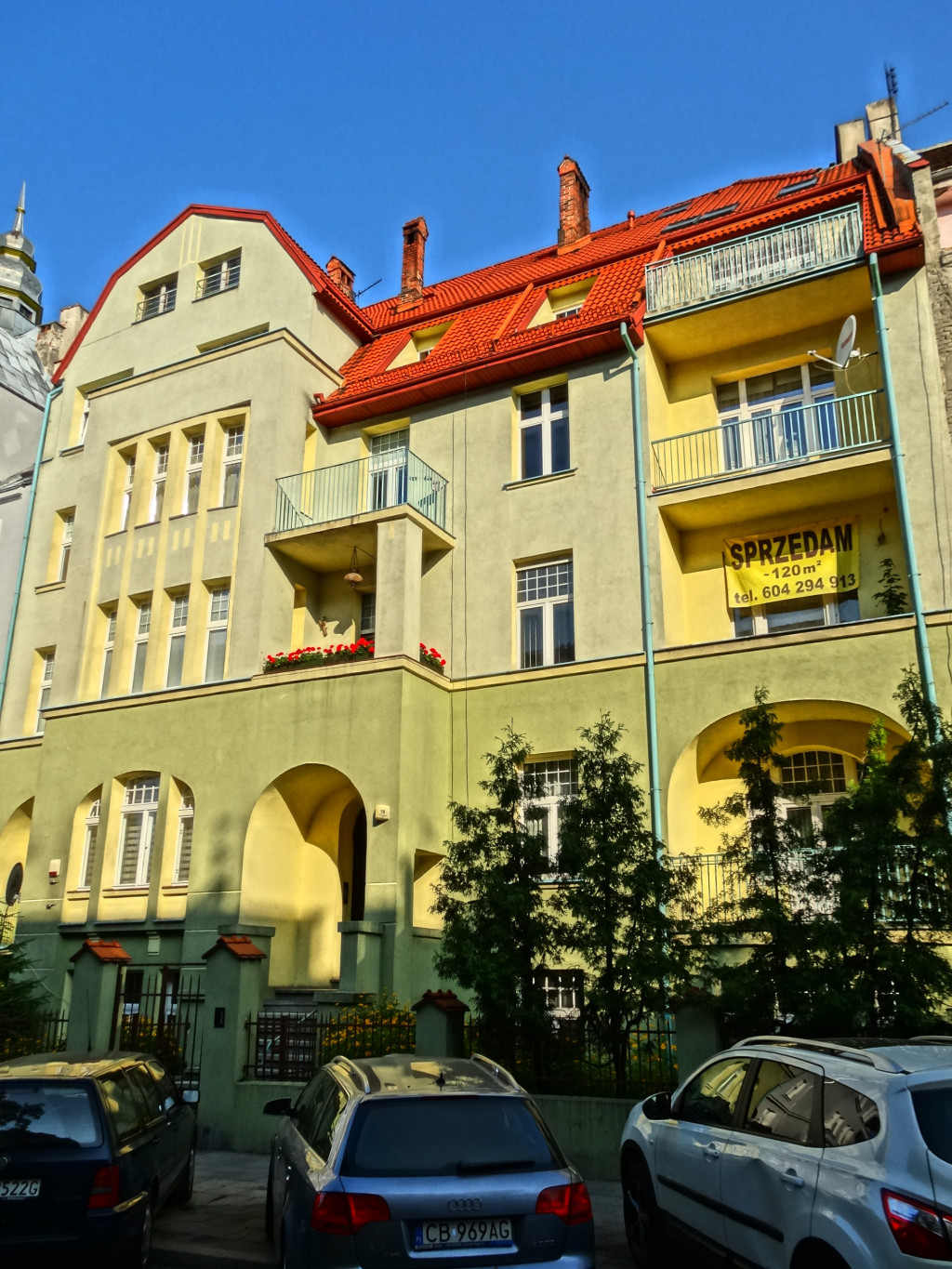
Facade on the street

=== Tenement at 20 ===
1911, by Alfred Mielke

The building commissioner was Max Reschke, a master carpenter who never lived there, but at neighbouring Nr.22.

The frontage, refurbished in 2017, displays the carved door crowned with a curved fan light and several cartouches, rosettes and other motifs in the Art Nouveau fashion.

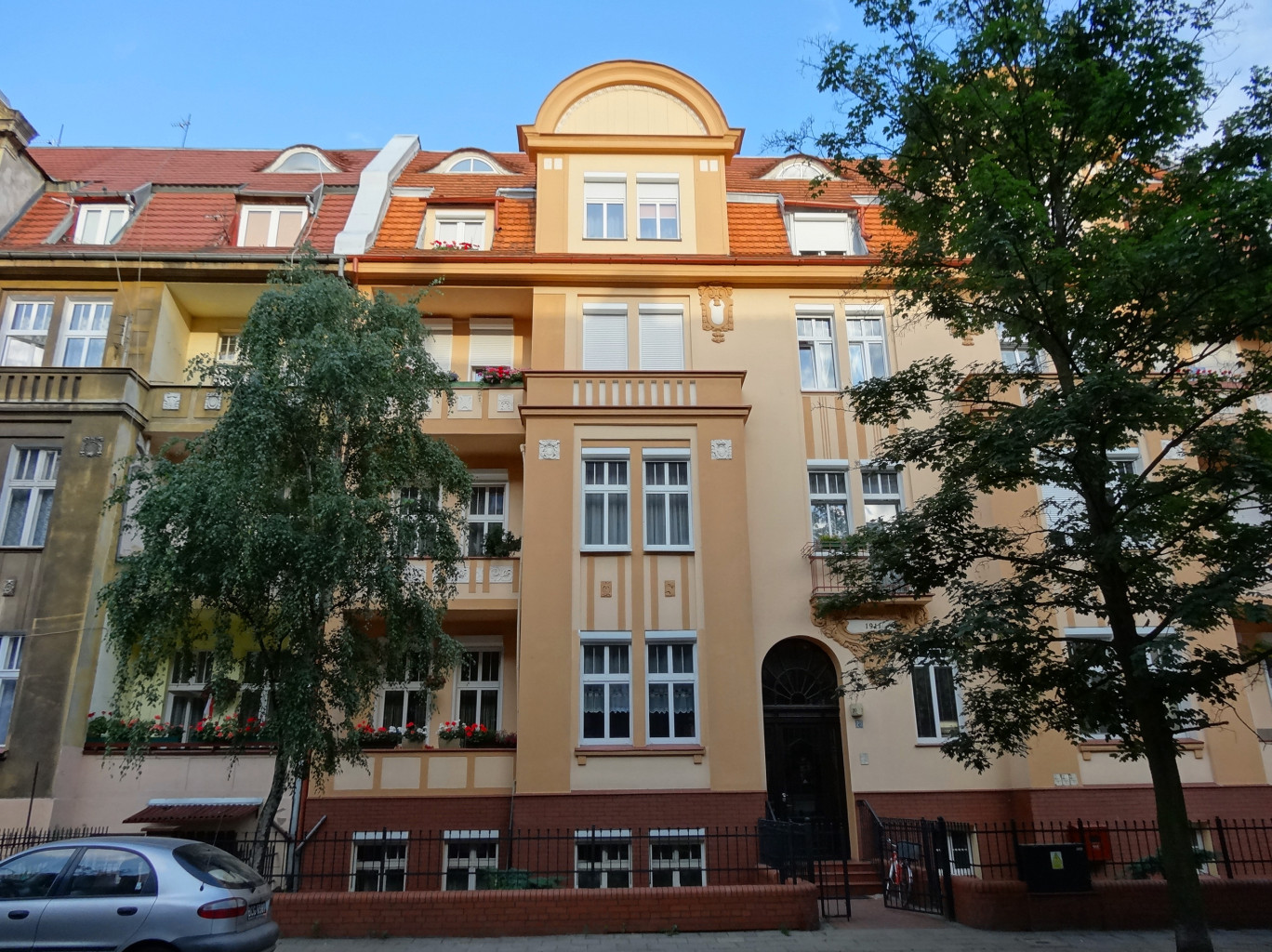
Facade on the street

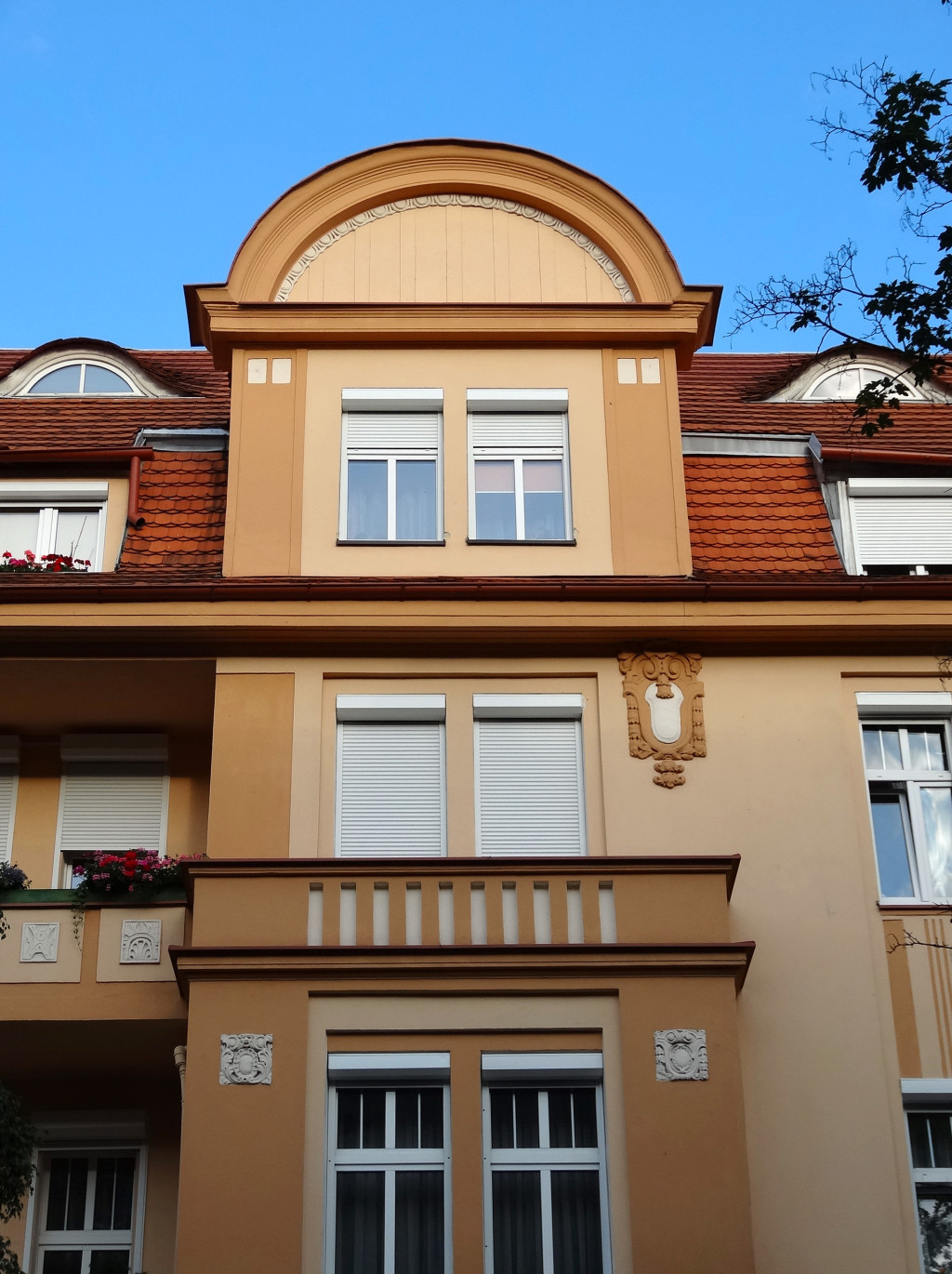
Detail of an avant-corps

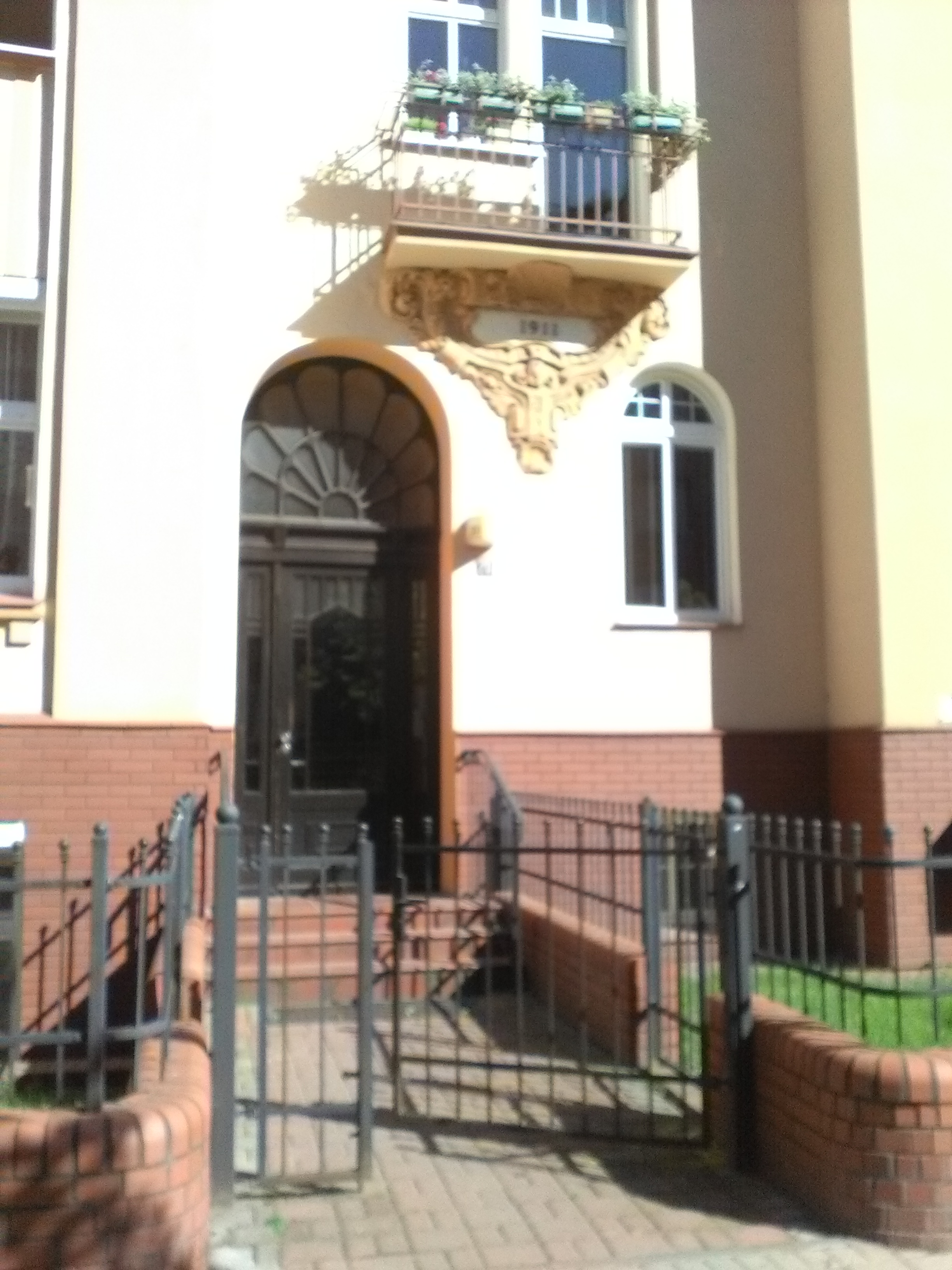
Door at Nr.20

=== Tenement at 21 ===
1912, by Georg Baesler

Art Nouveau

Commissioned by Józef Grabowski, a painter, to Georg Baesler; Grabowski never inhabited there. It was once the property of Erwin Wodke, co-owner of a transport company F.Wodtke - International Furniture Transport which stables and warehouses were located in the backyard accessible through the gateway.

Although damaged by time, the facade still exhibits wrought iron balconies and railings.

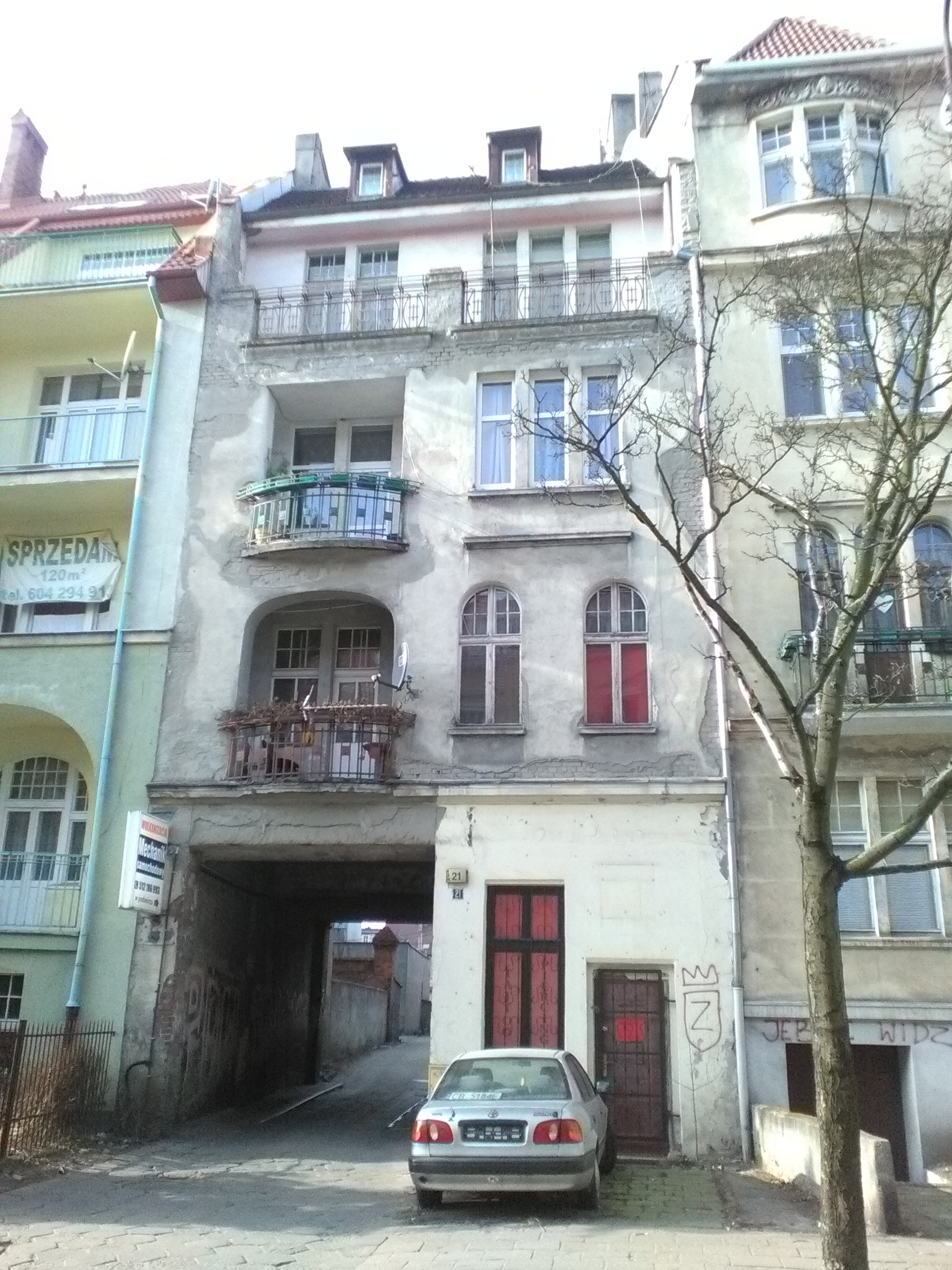
Facade on the street

=== Tenement at 22 ===
1911, by Alfred Mielke

Art Nouveau

Realized after an order from Max Reschke, a master carpenter, also owner of Nr.20. His widow lived there till the 1930s. The tenement has been thoroughly renovated in 2021.

The large facade displays scattered rosettes. Its two massive avant-corps are topped by terraces. There are Art Nouveau mouldings beneath a balcony, as well as on gable top. The main entrance door boasts a web-shaped transom light.

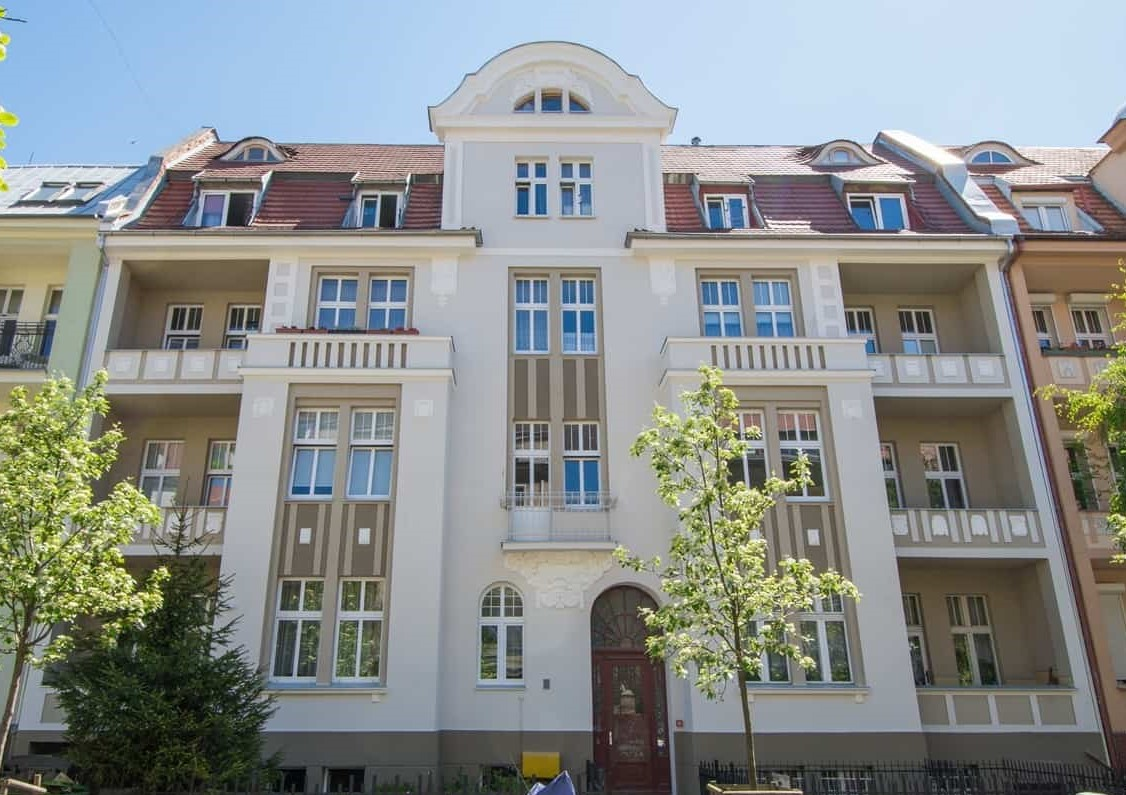
Facade on the street

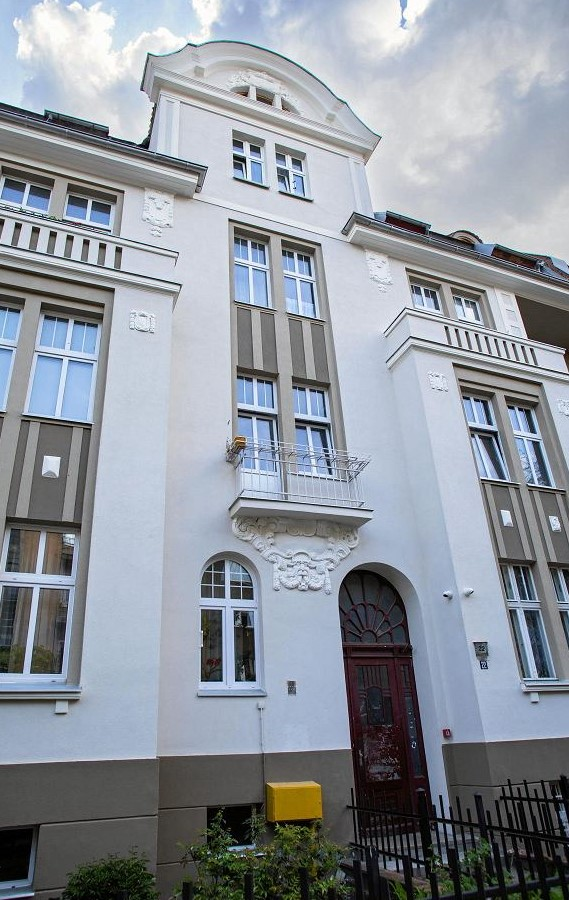
Detail of the facade

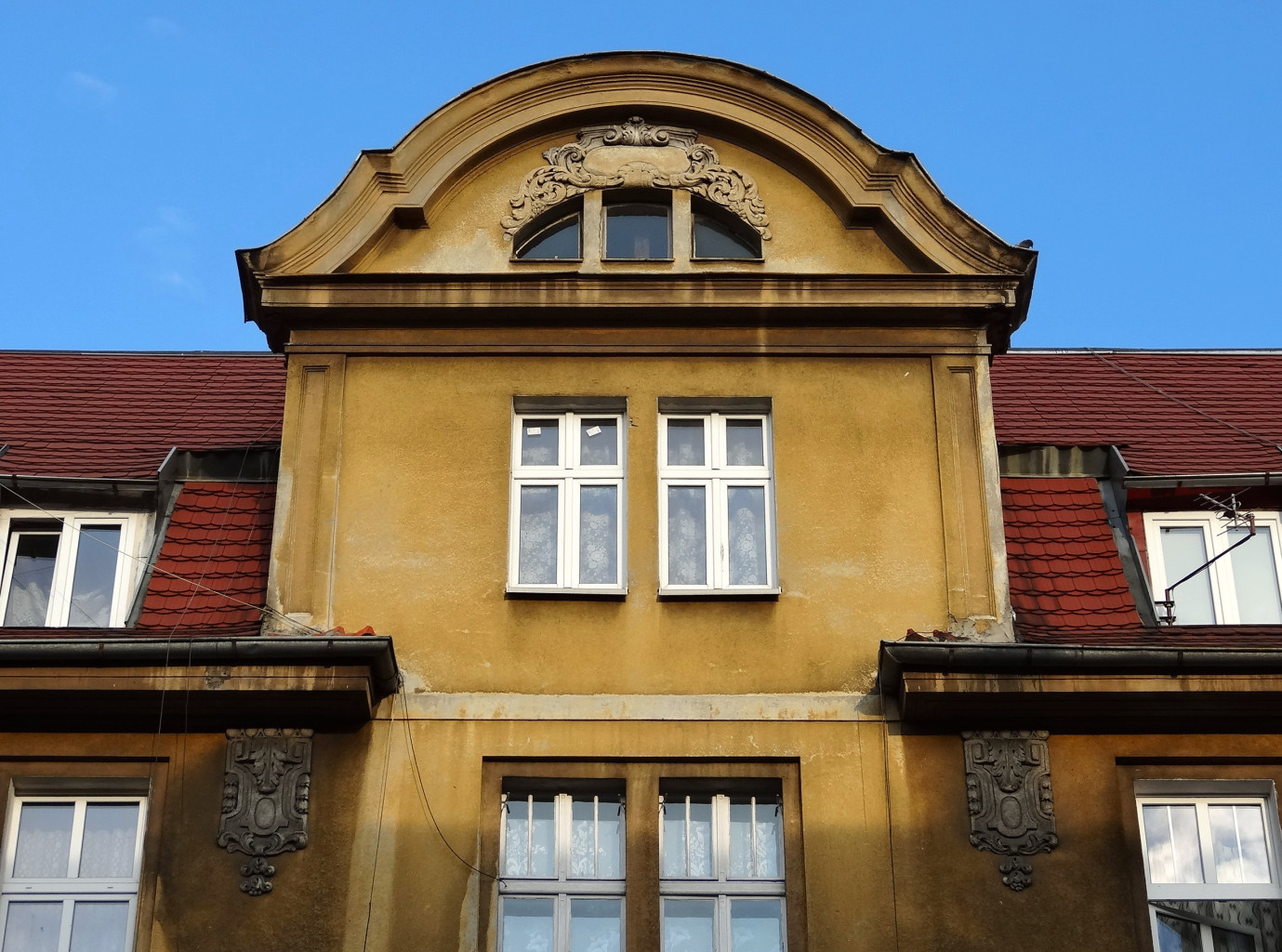
Gable detail

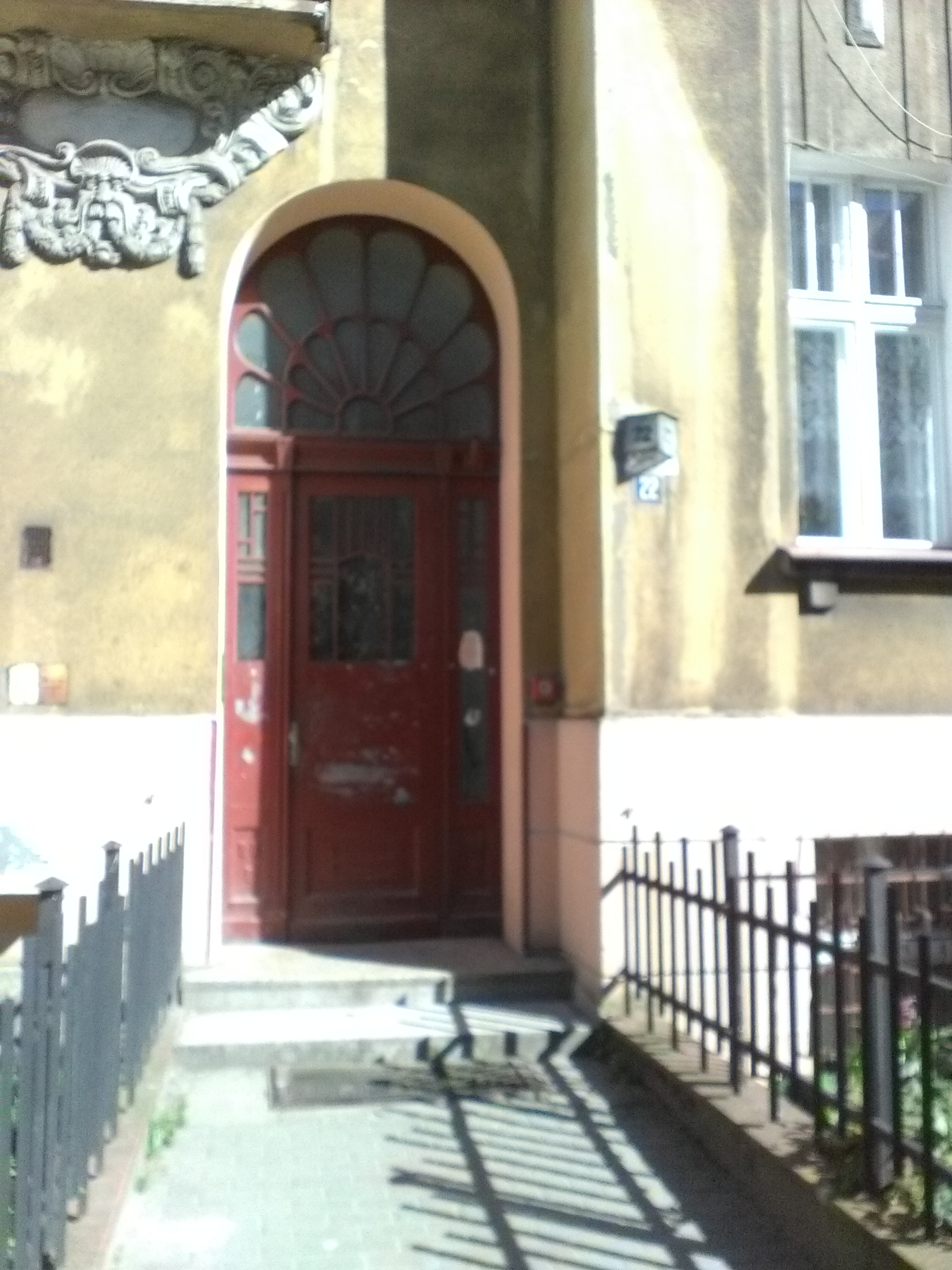
Door with transom light.

=== Tenement at 23 ===
1912, by Georg Baesler

Art Nouveau

Similarly to the building at Nr.21, this one has also been commissioned by Józef Grabowski, a painter and realized by Georg Baesler.

Specific to this facade, one can notice two round avant-corps flanking a portal with columns and festoon. Both gables are embellished with floral motif mouldings and a frieze.

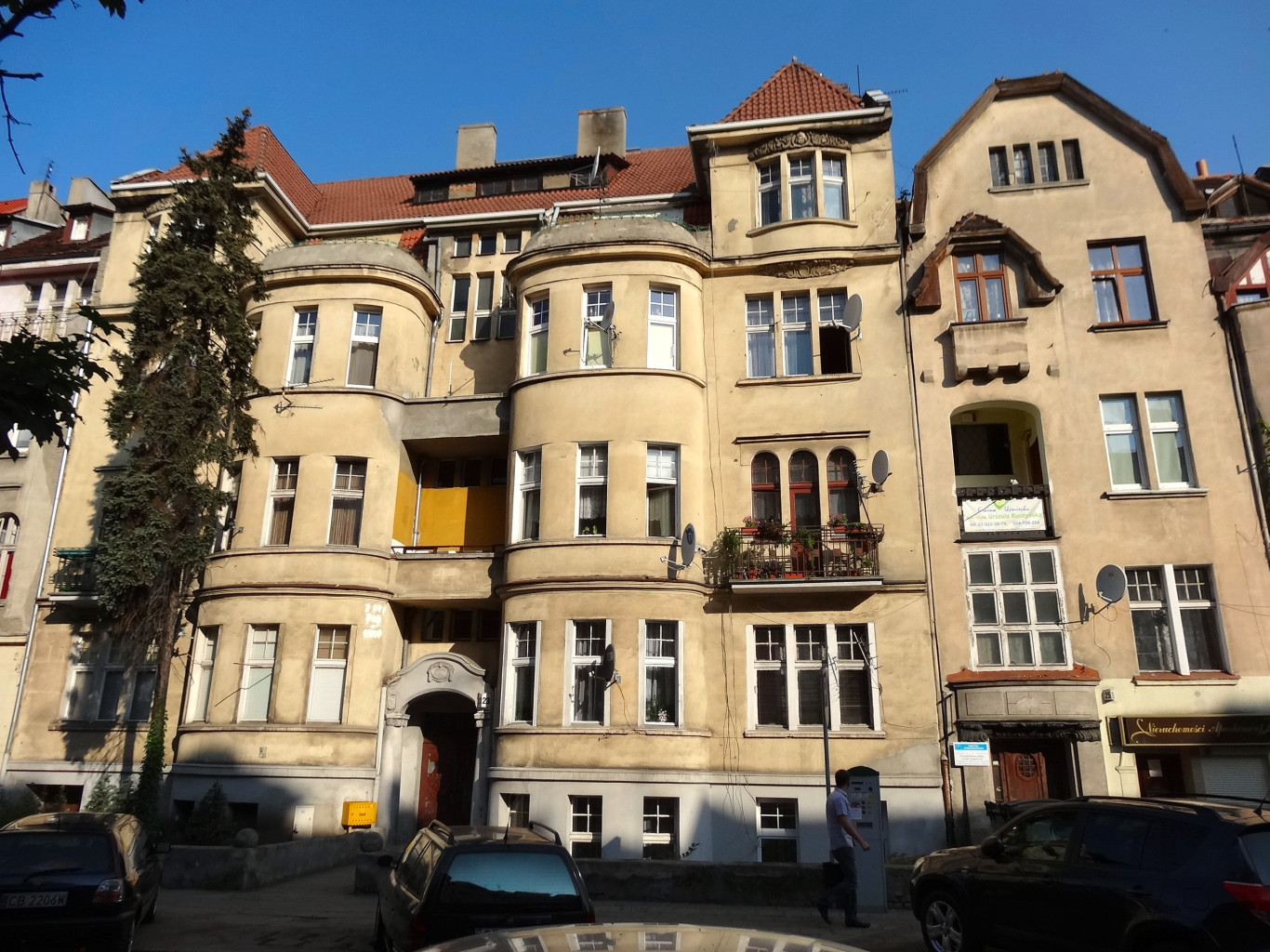
Facade on the street

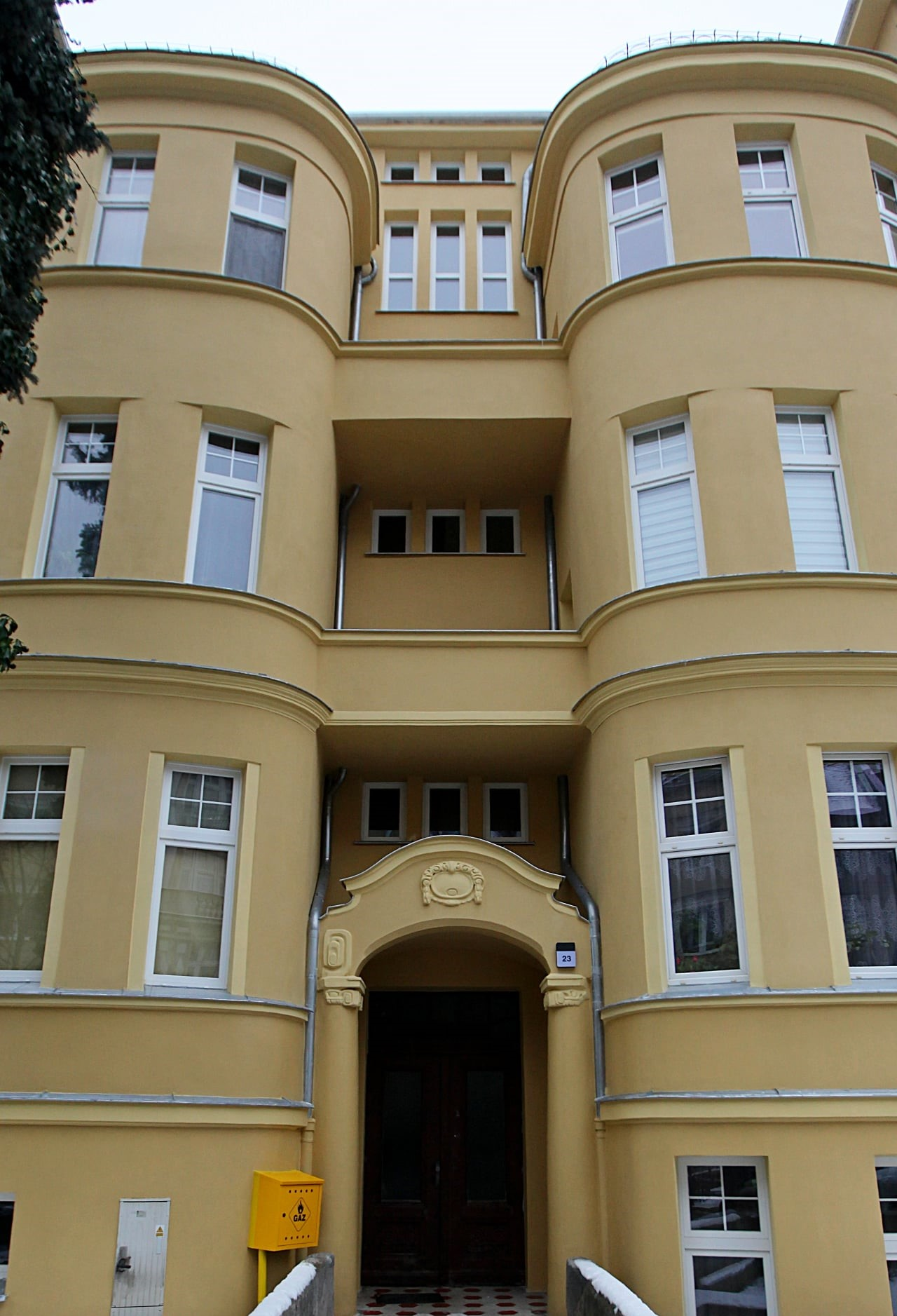
Facade after renovation

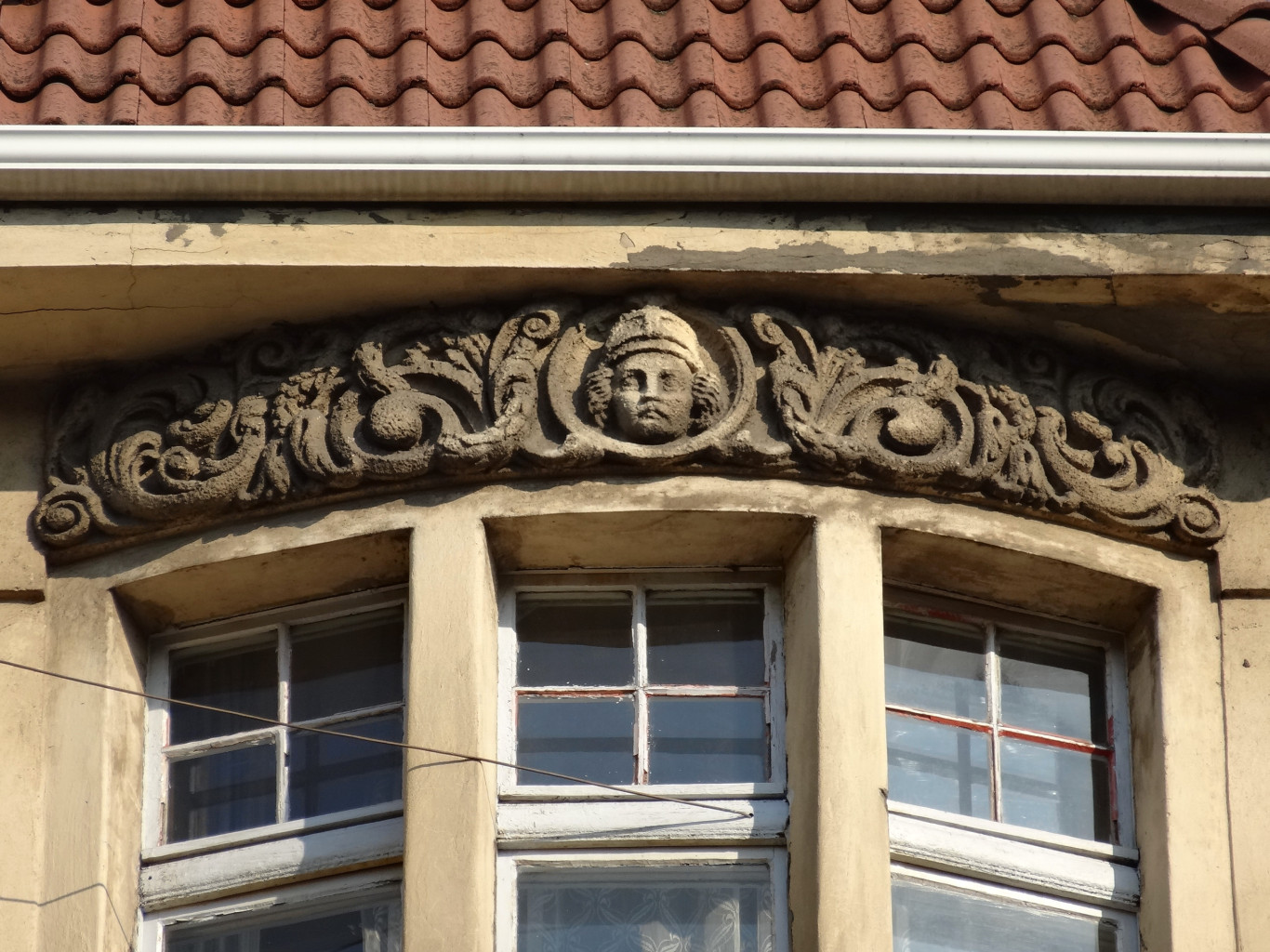
Frieze detail

=== Tenement at 24 ===
Registered on Kuyavian-Pomeranian Voivodeship heritage list, Nr.A/379/1 (November 12, 1993)

1911, by Rudolf Kern

Art Nouveau

The first owner was Emil Zemisch, a building contractor.

The superb elevation, renovated in 2017, boasts myriads of Art Nouveau motifs and details, on the avant-corps, the bay-window, or on the gable and the entrance portal.

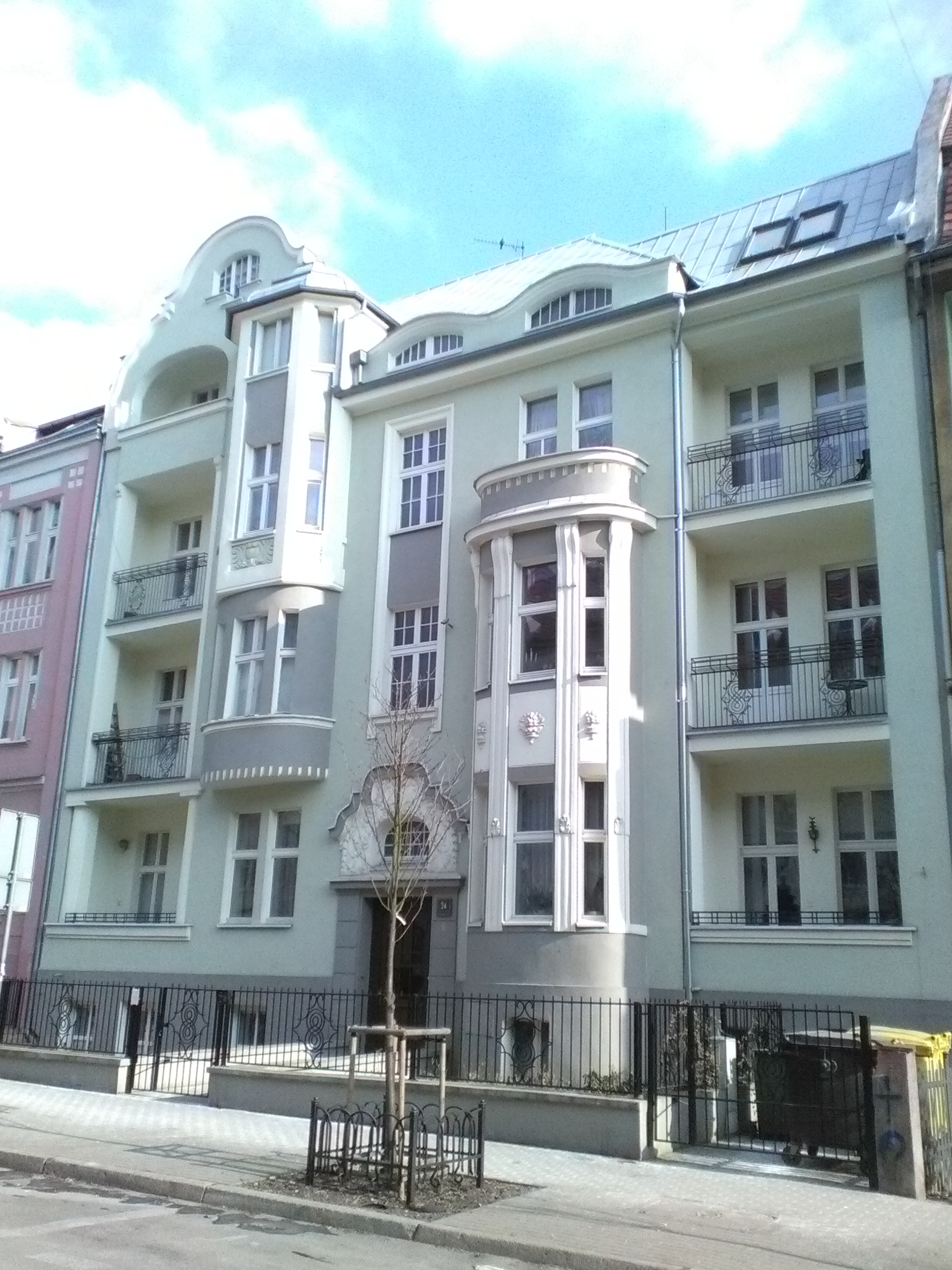
Restored frontage

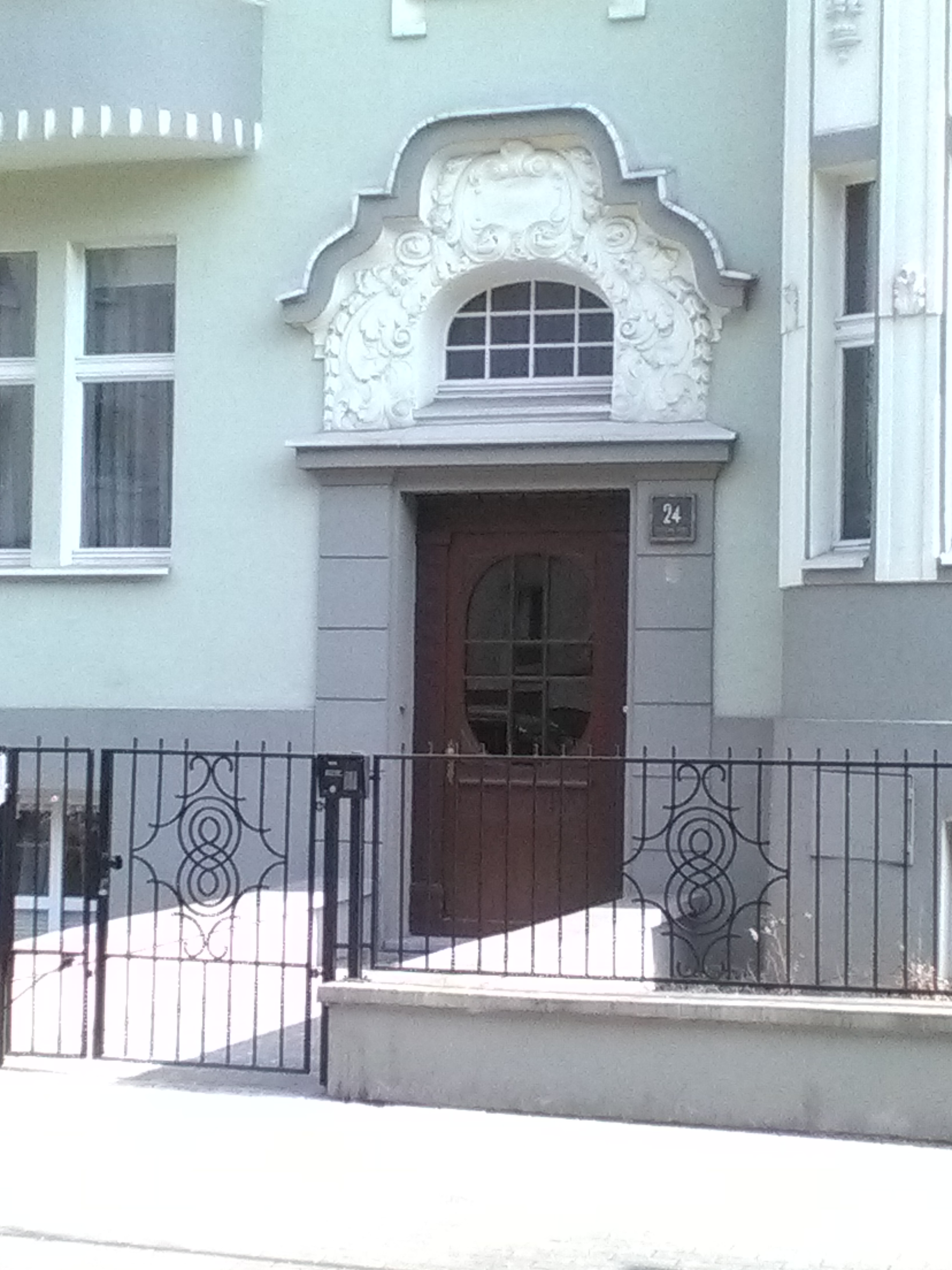
Detail of the portal

=== Tenement at 25 ===
ca 1910, by Johannes Cornelius

Elements of Art Nouveau

First landlord and commissioner was Herman Pflaum, a master engraver.

The facade is a bit deprived of its original decoration. One can still appreciate some motifs around the entrance door and at the bottom of the avant-corps.

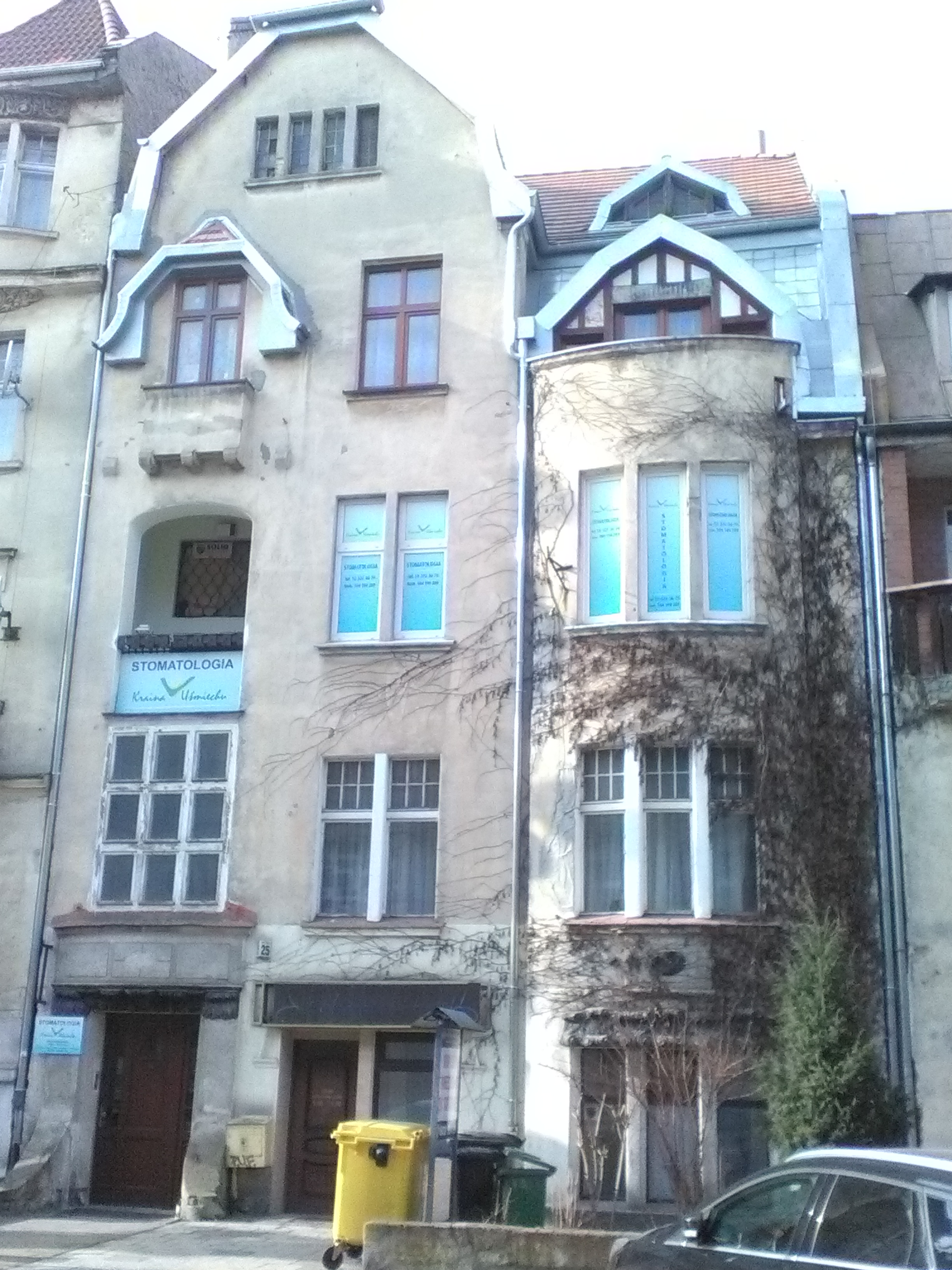
Main frontage

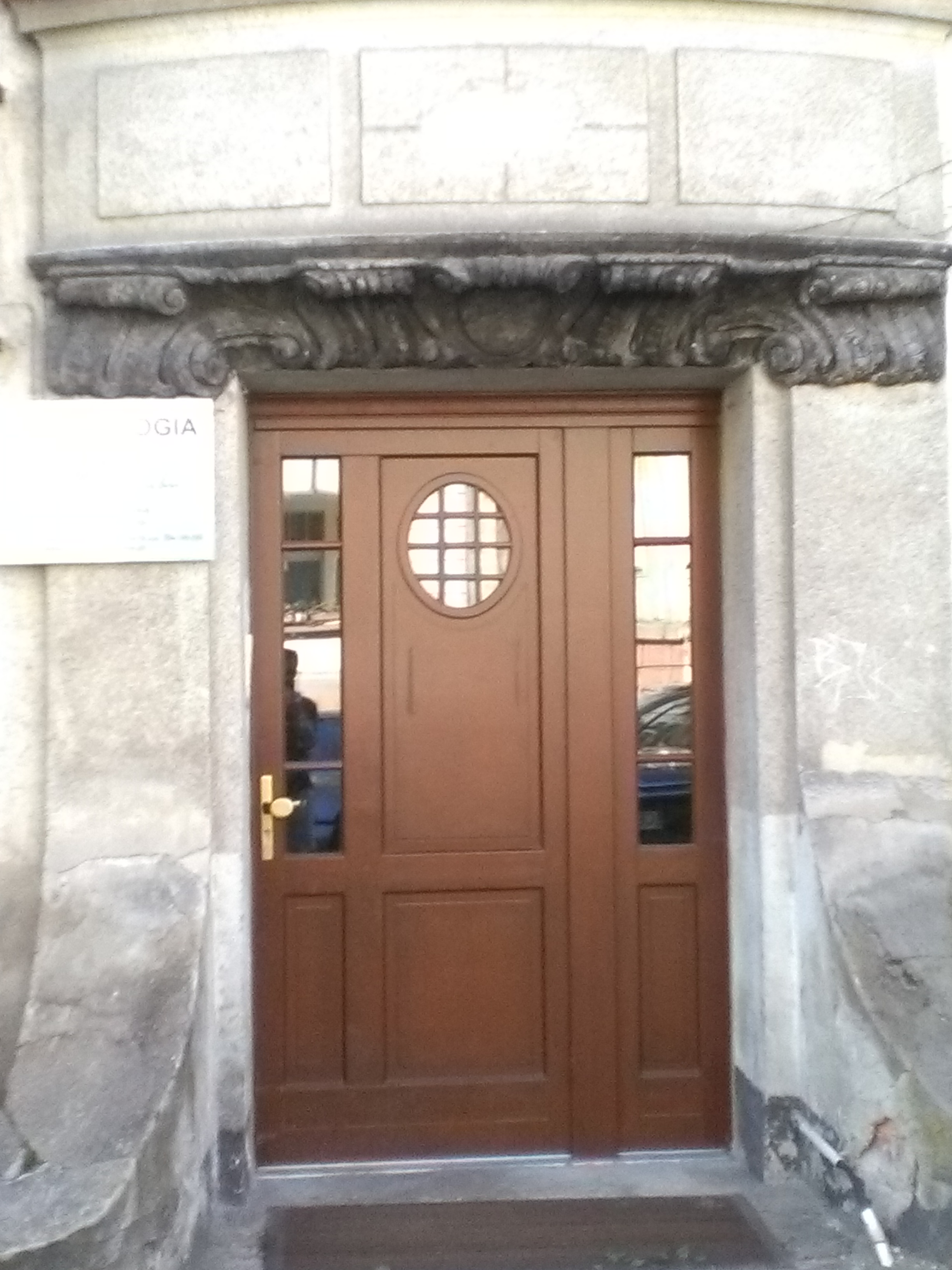
Entrance door at Nr.25

=== Tenement at 14 Chodkiewicza, corner with 26 20 Stycznia 1920 street ===
Registered on Kuyavian-Pomeranian Voivodeship heritage list, Nr.A/1384 (September 16, 2008)

1907, by Rudolf Kern

Art Nouveau

The first landlord and building commissioner was Friedrich Fiedler, a merchant.

Nicely refurbished in 2016–2017, the tenement exhibits leasing Art Nouveau details with rosettes and mouldings. A superb round gable overlooking the terrace on top of the avant-corps is adorned with representative Art nouveau motifs: a figure head, flanked by vegetal festoons. Likewise, the transom light over the entrance door is surrounded by a moulding with Art Nouveau features.

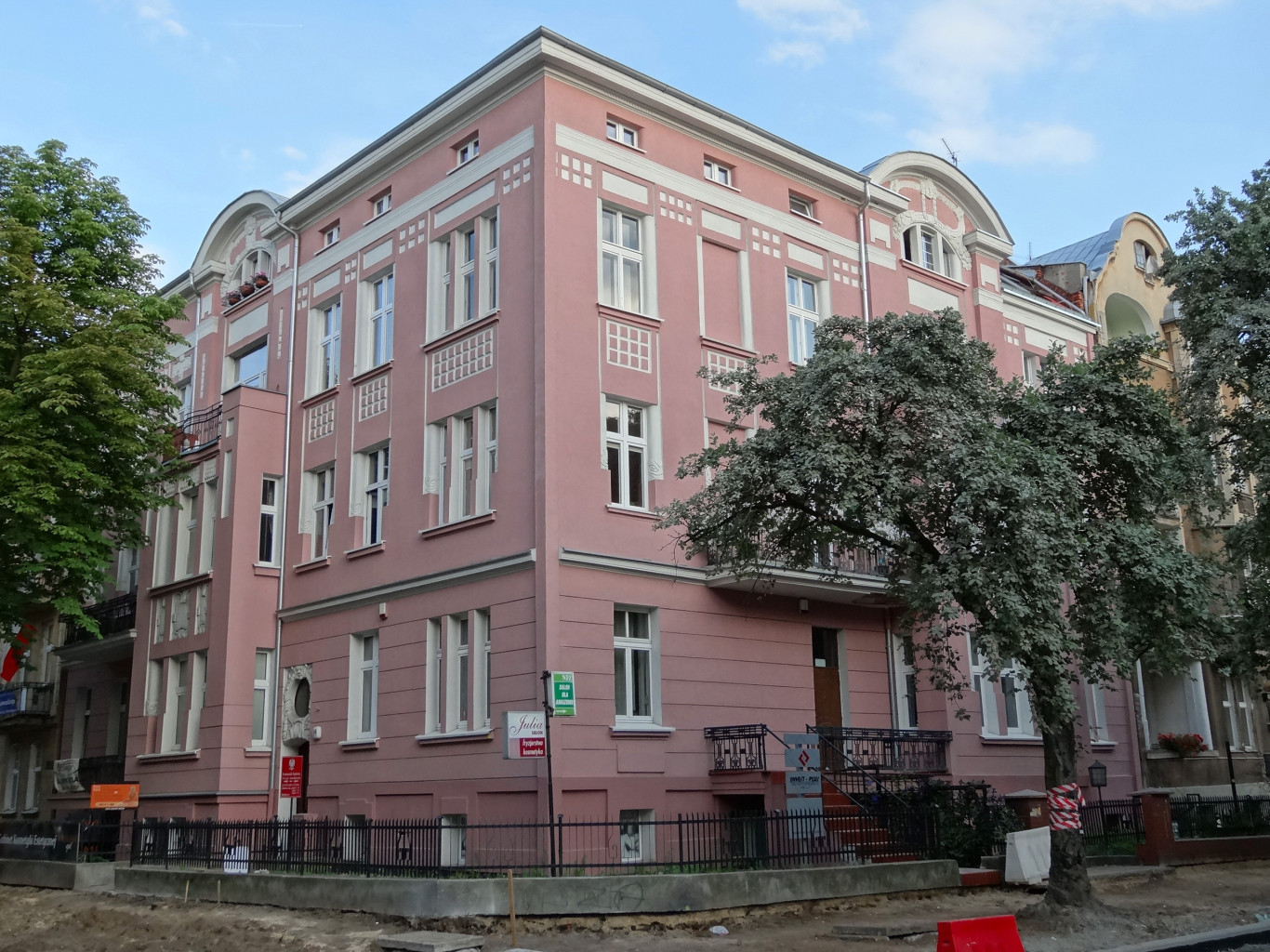
Frontages from street intersection

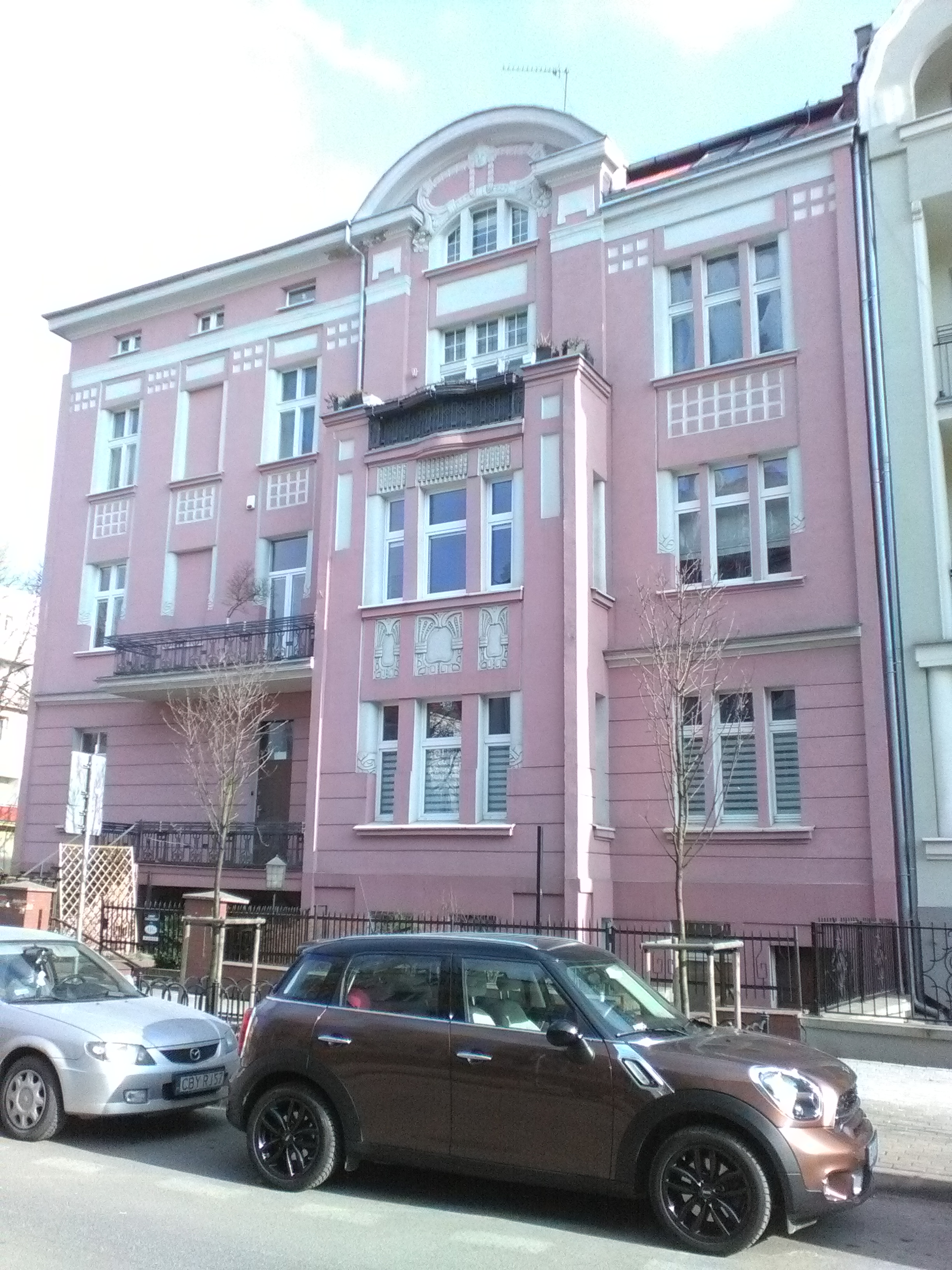
Facade on 20 Stycznia 1920 street

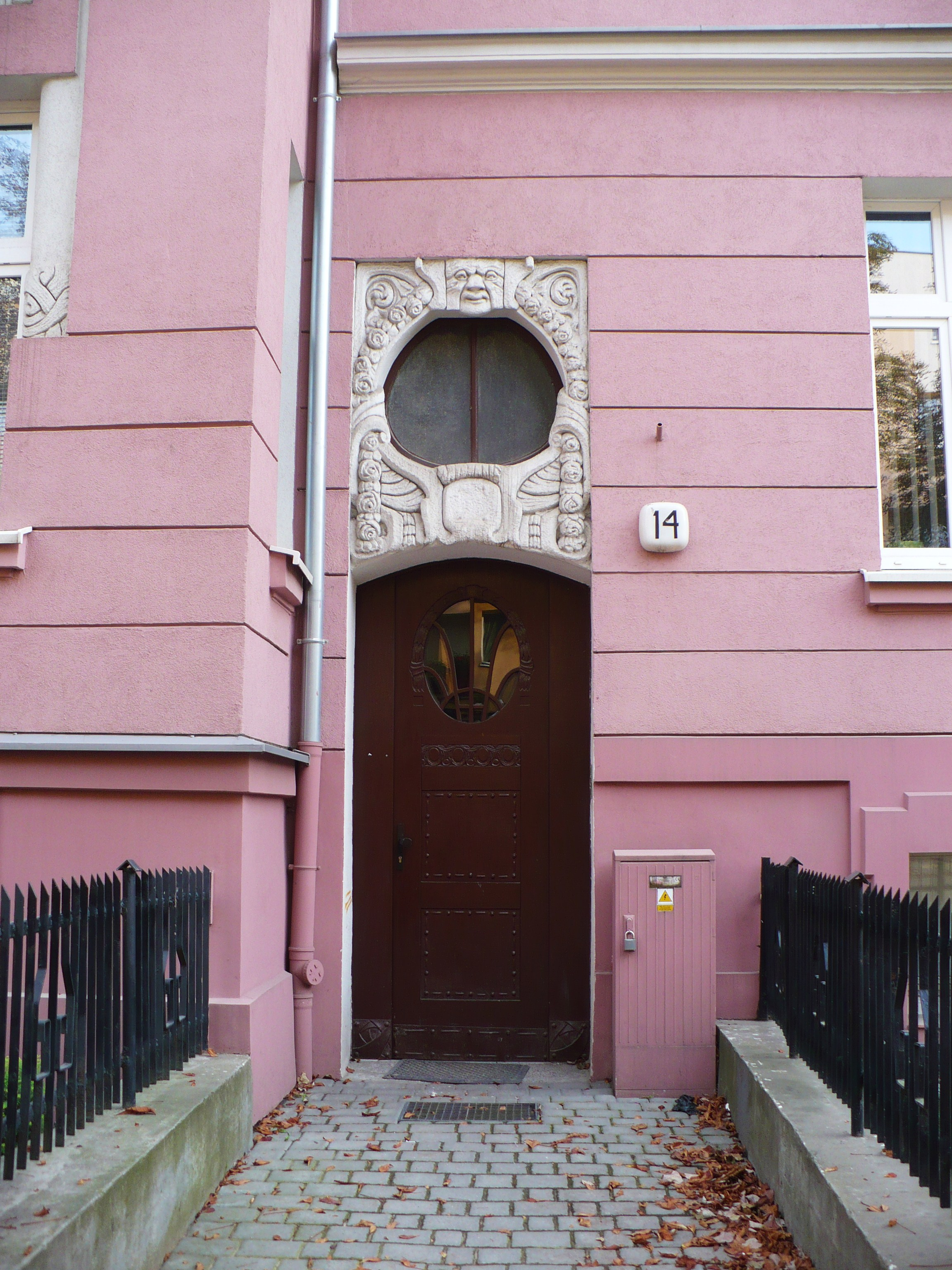
Decorated portal

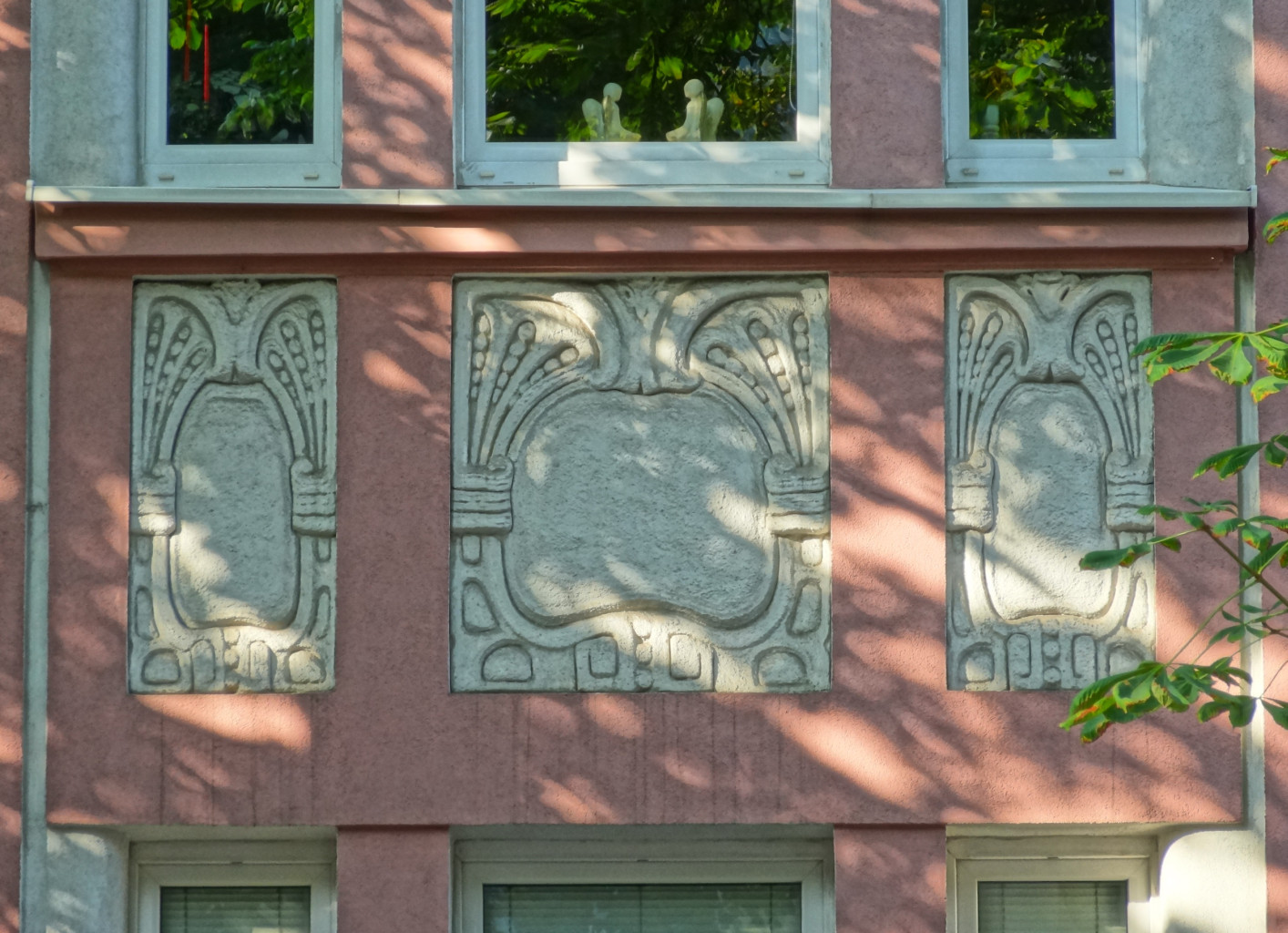
Cartouches

=== Tenement at 27 ===
1910, purportedly by Rudolf Kern

Eclecticism

A merchant, Emil Dittmann, was the first owner of the place. He was still living there in the 1930s.

Rudolf Kern has used the same pattern for both houses at Nr.27 and 29. Two doors on the street, a gable on the right hand of the facade (triangular here) and a loggia on the left hand. Only alteration regards the bay-window in lieu of an avant-corps at Nr.29.

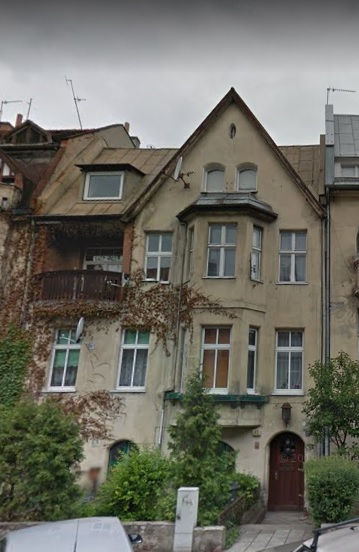
Main frontage

=== Tenement at 29 ===
1910, by Rudolf Kern

Eclecticism

Alexander Schmidt was the commissioner of the tenement. He was director of the factory Bromberger Maschinenfabrik Hermann Löhnert producing machine tools, established in 1868 in Bromberg.

Rudolf Kern has used the same pattern for both houses at Nr.27 and 29. Two doors on the street, a gable on the right hand of the facade (ogee shaped here) and a loggia on the left hand (round topped there). Only alteration regards the avant-corps, where a bay-window is built at Nr.27.

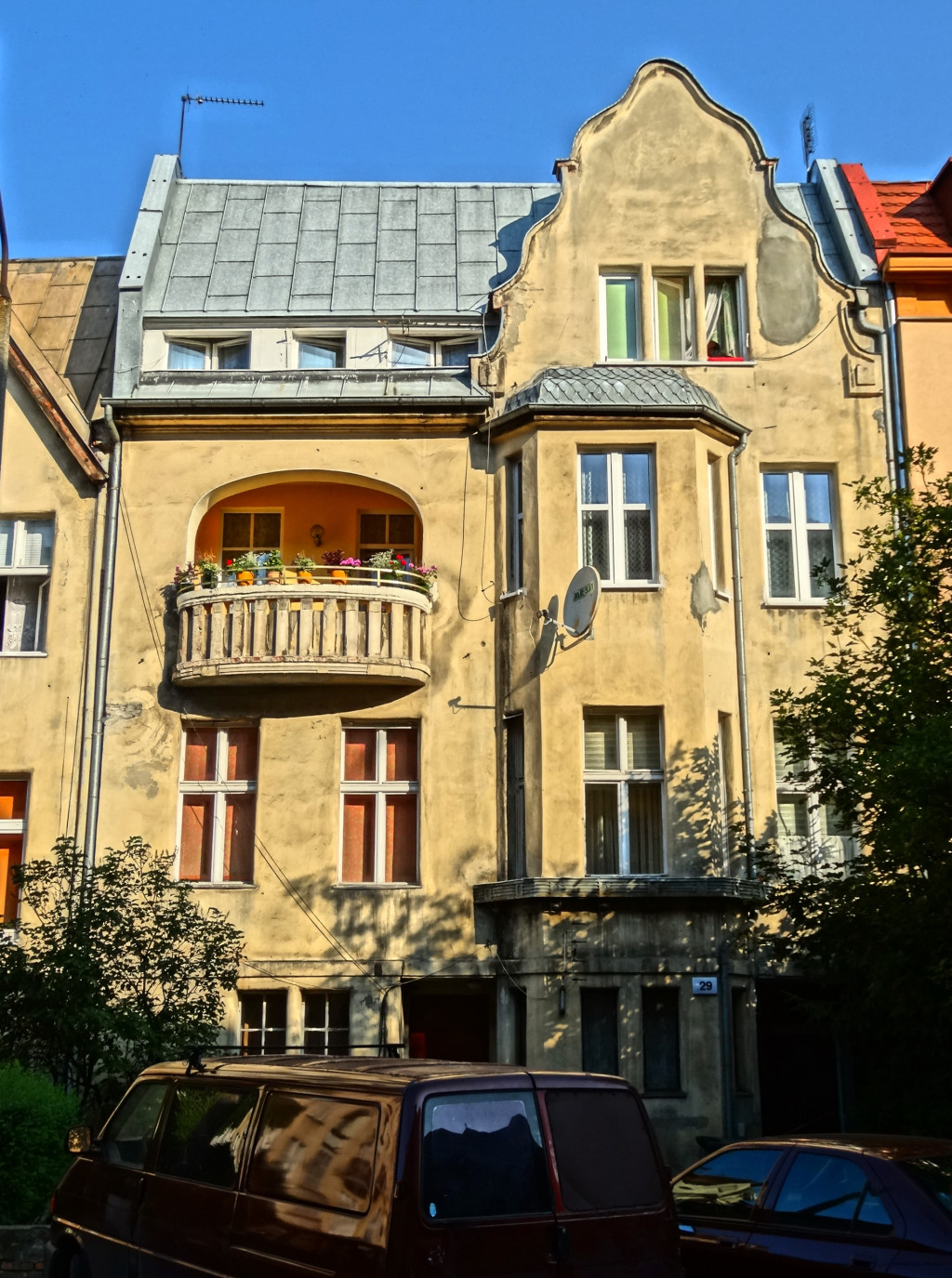
Main frontage

=== Tenement at 41 ===
1936, by Jan Kossowski

Modernism

Jan Kossowski (1898–1958) has been a very prolific Polish architect and builder, mainly associated with Bydgoszcz. His professional activity stretches from the interwar period to the 1940s.

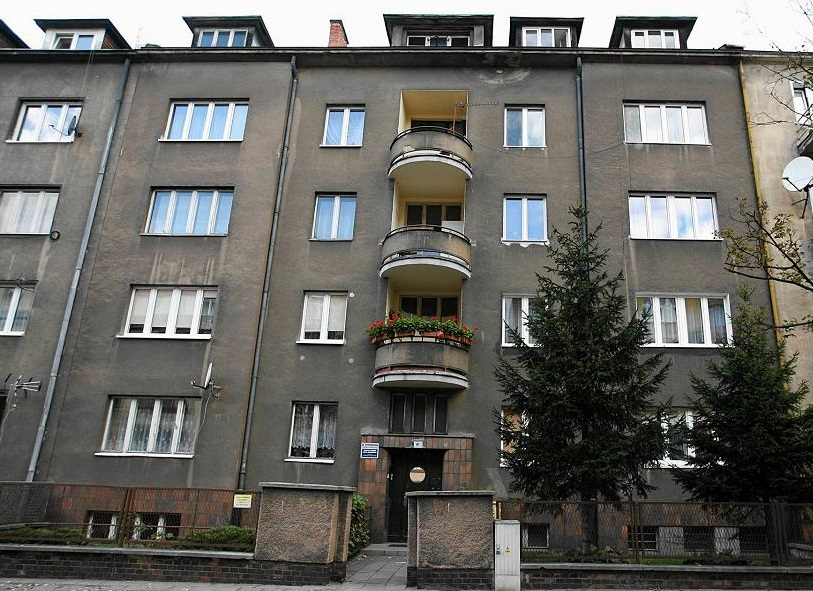
Main frontage on the street

== See also ==
- Bydgoszcz
- Fritz Weidner
- Rudolf Kern
- Bydgoszcz Architects (1850-1970s)

== Bibliography ==
- Bręczewska-Kulesza, Daria (2004). Nowoczesna dzielnica mieszkaniowa z początku XX w. Kronika Bydgoska T26 (in Polish). Bydgoszcz: Towarzystwo Miłosnikow Miasta Bydgoszczy-Bydgoskie Towarzystwo Naukowe. pp. 69–94.
- Umiński, Janusz (1999). Ulica 20 Stycznia 1920 roku. Kalendarz Bydgoski (in Polish). Bydgoszcz: Towarzystwo Miłośników Miasta Bydgoszczy. pp. 209–217.
