= Jana Karola Chodkiewicza Street, Bydgoszcz =

Street

Coordinates: 53°07′53″N 18°01′28″E

Jana Karola Chodkiewicza street
Bydgoszcz
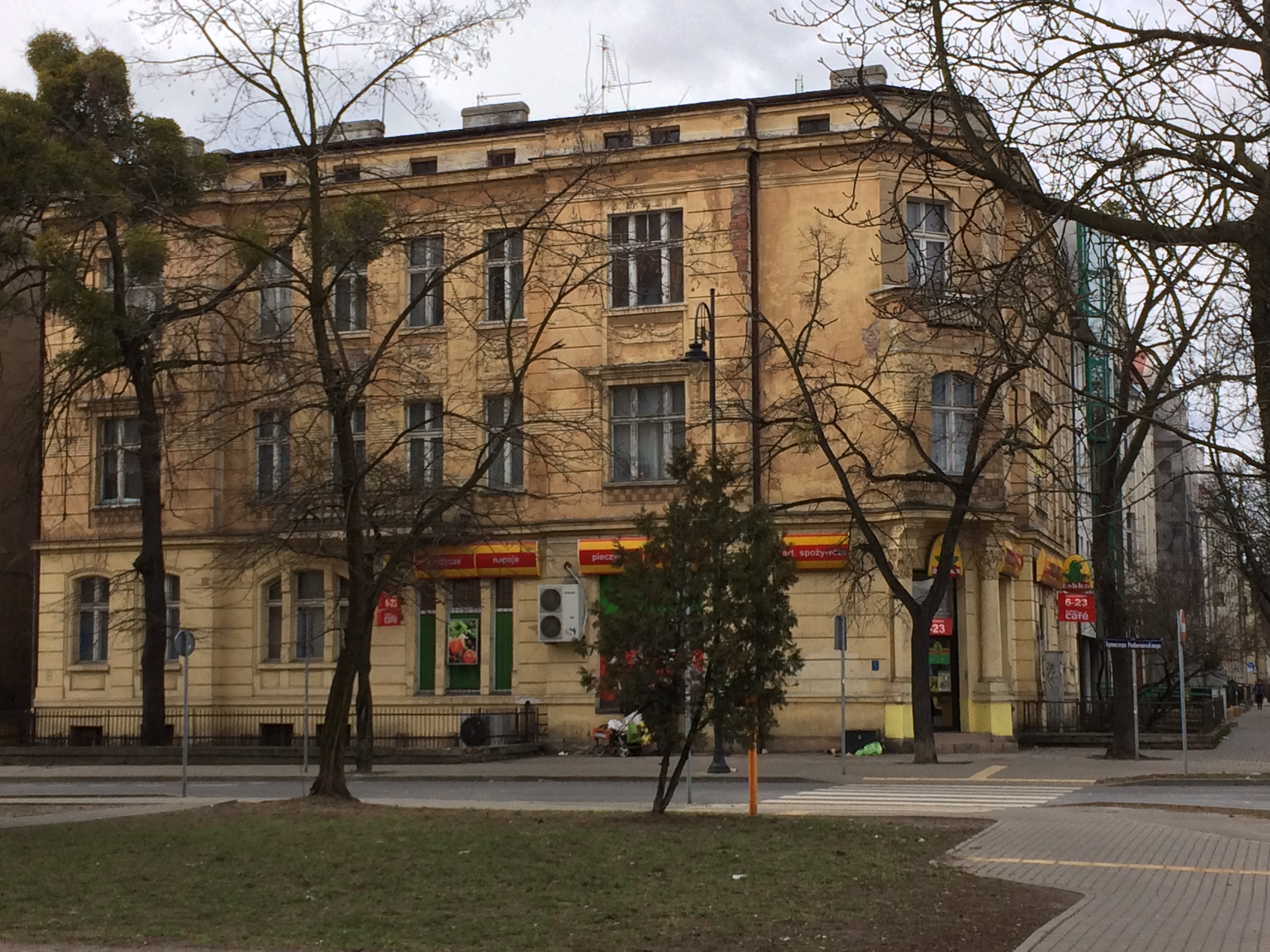
- View at the crossing with Paderewkiego street

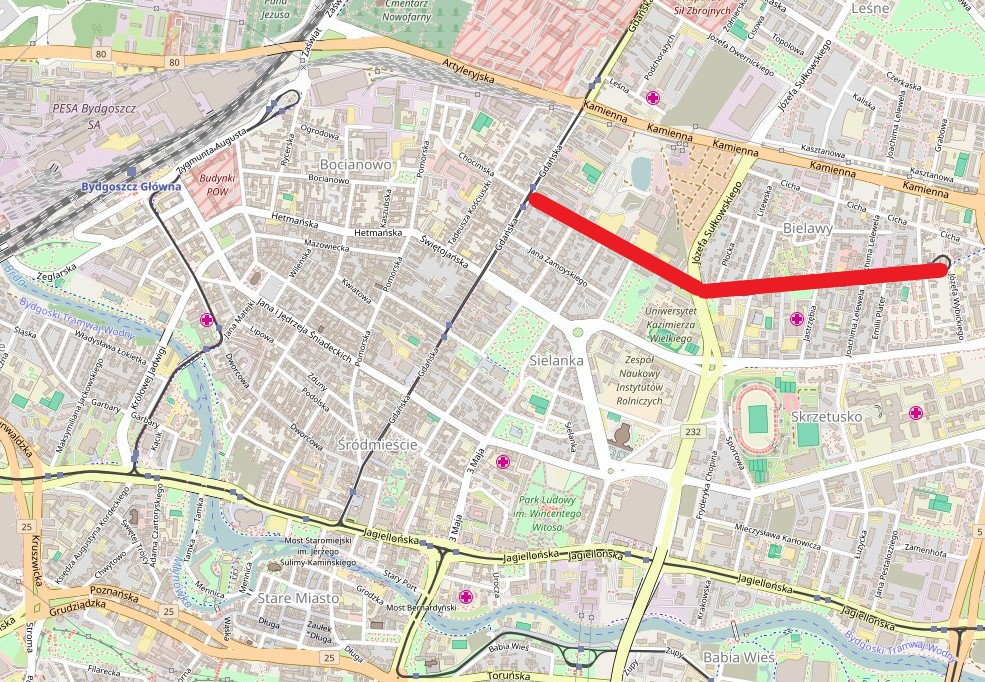
- Chodkiewicza street on a map of Bydgoszcz
- Native name: Ulica Jana Karola Chodkiewicza w Bydgoszczy (Polish)
- Former names: Hauptweg, Kurfürsten straße, Bleichfelder Weg., Ulica Senatorska
- Part of: Bielawy district
- Namesake: Jan Karol Chodkiewicz
- Owner: City of Bydgoszcz
- Length: 1,700 m (5,600 ft)
- Width: ca. 10m
- Location: Bydgoszcz, Poland

Construction
- Construction start: 1903

Chodkiewicza street is one of the most important arteries of Bydgoszcz centre, enabling to cross the city on an east–west axis. Many buildings along this axis undeniably carry historic importance, some are registered on the Kuyavian-Pomeranian Voivodeship Heritage list.

== Location ==
Located in the northern part of Bydgoszcz, the avenue runs through Bocianowo and Bielawy districts, together with the tram line Nr.4 following its path. Chodkiewicza street starts on its western side at the crossing with Gdańska Street and ends in the east when intercepting the urban portion of the S5 expressway.

== History ==
In the 1870s, the northern extension of Gdańska Street reached today's intersection with Chodkiewicza street. The area in the east delineated by present-day Gdańska, Krasińskiego, Ogiński and Chodkiewicza streets was then purchased by municipal authorities. This domain, so-called Hempelscher Felde from the name of a previous landlord, was divided at the end of the 19th century and mapped out to draft streets.

The first houses on Chodkiewicza street date back to the beginning of the 20th century, mostly located on the western part of the street, close to the main axis of the city that was (and still is) Gdańska street. This section comprised low tenement houses with front gardens: one can still appreciate instances of these buildings at Nos. 2,5,4-6 or 8.

Before 1920, the eastern section of Chodkiewicza street was situated beyond Bydgoszcz city limits, in the rural commune of Bleichfelde (English: Bleachfield). In the early 20th century, the avenue was the main street of the village, concentrating the majority of the existing buildings.

On June 13, 1890, German railway officials found Beamten – Wohnungsverein GmbH (Official Housing Association), a global housing cooperative. In 1902, the Bromberg seat, ancestor of today's Bydgoszcz Housing Cooperative (Polish: Bydgoska Spółdzielnia Mieszkaniowa) used loans from the Prussian government to build in a 6.5 hectares (16 acres)-area, north of Bleichfelder Strasse (previous name of Chodkiewicza), a real estate project of two-story, single-family brick houses called Villen Kolonie. The ensemble was completed in two years and caused a serious crisis on the real estate market of Bromberg center: as a result, the city refused to connect the Villenkolonie Bleichfelde to the municipal water supply and energy infrastructure until 1920.

Several factories set up along the northern side of then Bleichfelder Weg during the end of the Prussian period (1900–1920):

- a municipal brick factory (at 8/16 Bleichfelder), active from the 1910s to the outset of WW II;
- Hermann Boettcher factory of metalwork and steel structures (at 17/18 Bleichfelder Weg), from the 1890s till the 1910s;
- Ludwig Kolwitz industries of metal and steel, from 1905 (at 19/21 Bleichfelder). Kolwitz expanded the premises by purchasing the abutting Boetcher warehouse at the beginning of WWI;
- Agriculture union warehouse (at 1/2 Kurfürsten straße).

Most of these facilities were linked to the city railway network, using a branch (now gone) extending to southern urban facilities, such as the city gasworks and the city slaughterhouse.

After 1945, a tramway line is created, running from the main train station to Bielawy district. Its path, still active, follows Chodkiewicza street, including the end-of-line loop.

Since 2010, several investments have been realized nearby:

- a project for the new building of the Bydgoszcz Music Academy, at 9-11 Chodkiewicza;
- new residential ensemble are planned to replace disused 19th century factories, e.g. Botaniq at 19 Chodkiewicza, Sens at 9-11 Chodkiewicza or City Park, completed in 2019 at 19 Chodkiewicza.

In 2016, the street underwent a major refurbishment involving the removal of many old chestnut trees.

For a long time, the axis consisted of two separate streets, divided by today's Ogiński street, which marked city limits until 1920. Hence the avenue bore two distinctive names, until the Second World War when both sections were merged into one street, Albrecht Dürer straße. After 1945, a resolution of the Municipal National Council (Nr.VIII/45) endorsed the path to carry a unique name. However, until 1945, Chodkiewicza street bore the following names:

- In the late 19th century, the street was considered as a continuation of the Sedan Straße in the west of Danzigerstaße;
- Beginning 20th century, Bleichfelder Weg (Bleachfield street) (in Bromberg) / Hauptweg (Main street) (out of Bromberg);
- 1906 to 1920, Bleichfelder Weg (in Bromberg) / Kurfürsten straße (Electors street) (out of Bromberg);
- 1920–1933, Ulica Chodkiewicza (west) / ulica Senatorska (east);
- 1933–1939, Ulica Chodkiewicza (west) / ulica Bronisława Pierackiego (east);
- 1939–1945, Albrecht Dürer straße;
- Since 1945, ulica Chodkiewicza.

Current naming refers to Jan Karol Chodkiewicz (1561–1621), a military commander of the Polish–Lithuanian Commonwealth army, Field Hetman of Lithuania, Grand Hetman of Lithuania and one of the most prominent noblemen and military commanders of the Polish–Lithuanian Commonwealth of his time.

== Main areas and edifices ==
=== Adam Wysocki Tenement at 100 Gdańska Street, corner with Chodkiewicza street ===
Built in the 1930s by Paweł Wawrzon

Modern architecture

Adam Wysocki, running a business of chimney sweeping, commissioned the building in the early 1930s. Local architect was Paweł Wawrzon, from Bydgoszcz, living at 6 Kościuszki street.

Geometric features of the facades recall contemporary realizations in the city, especially those designed by Jan Kossowski or Bolesław Polakiewicz.

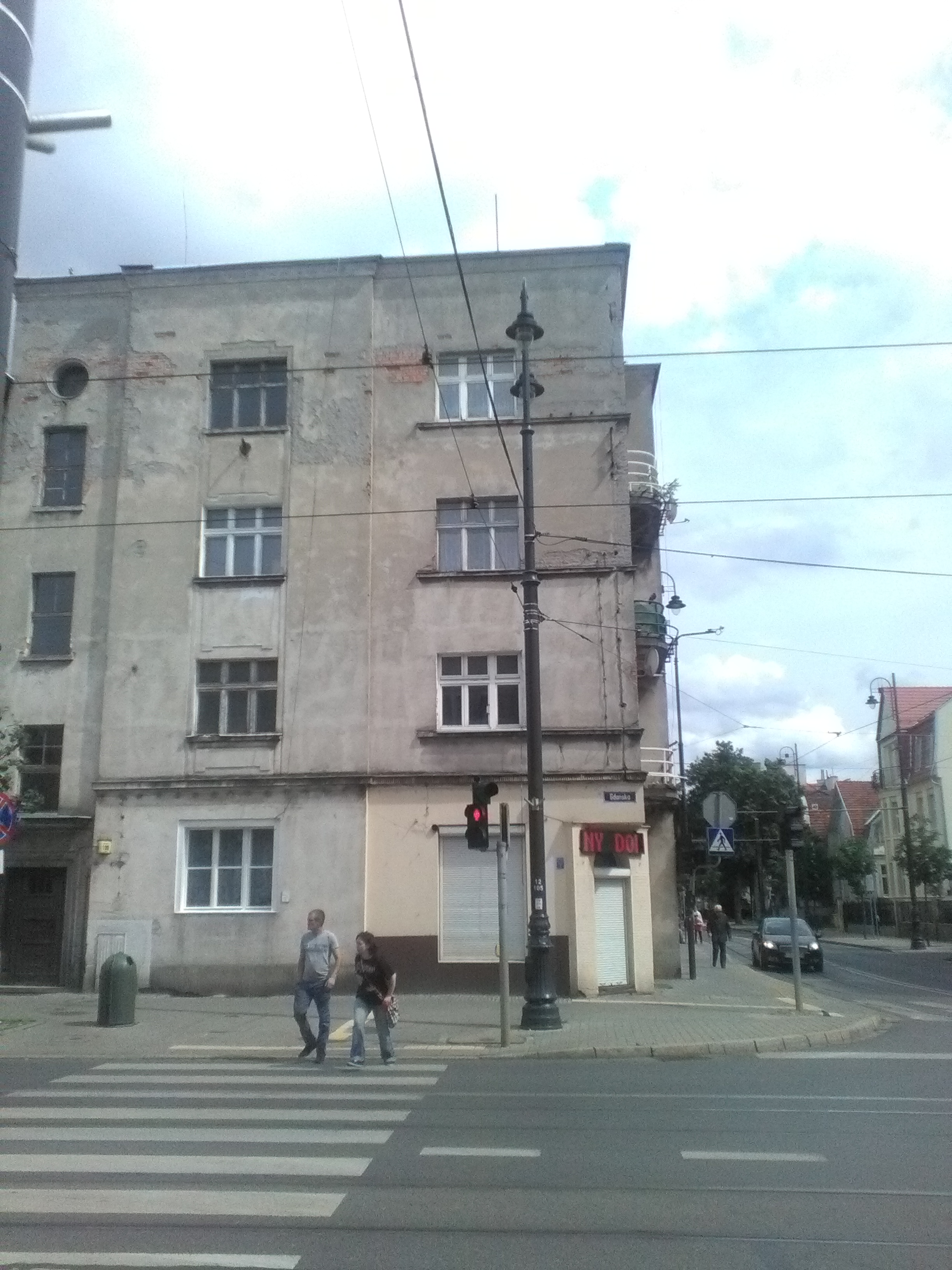
Main facade onto Gdańska

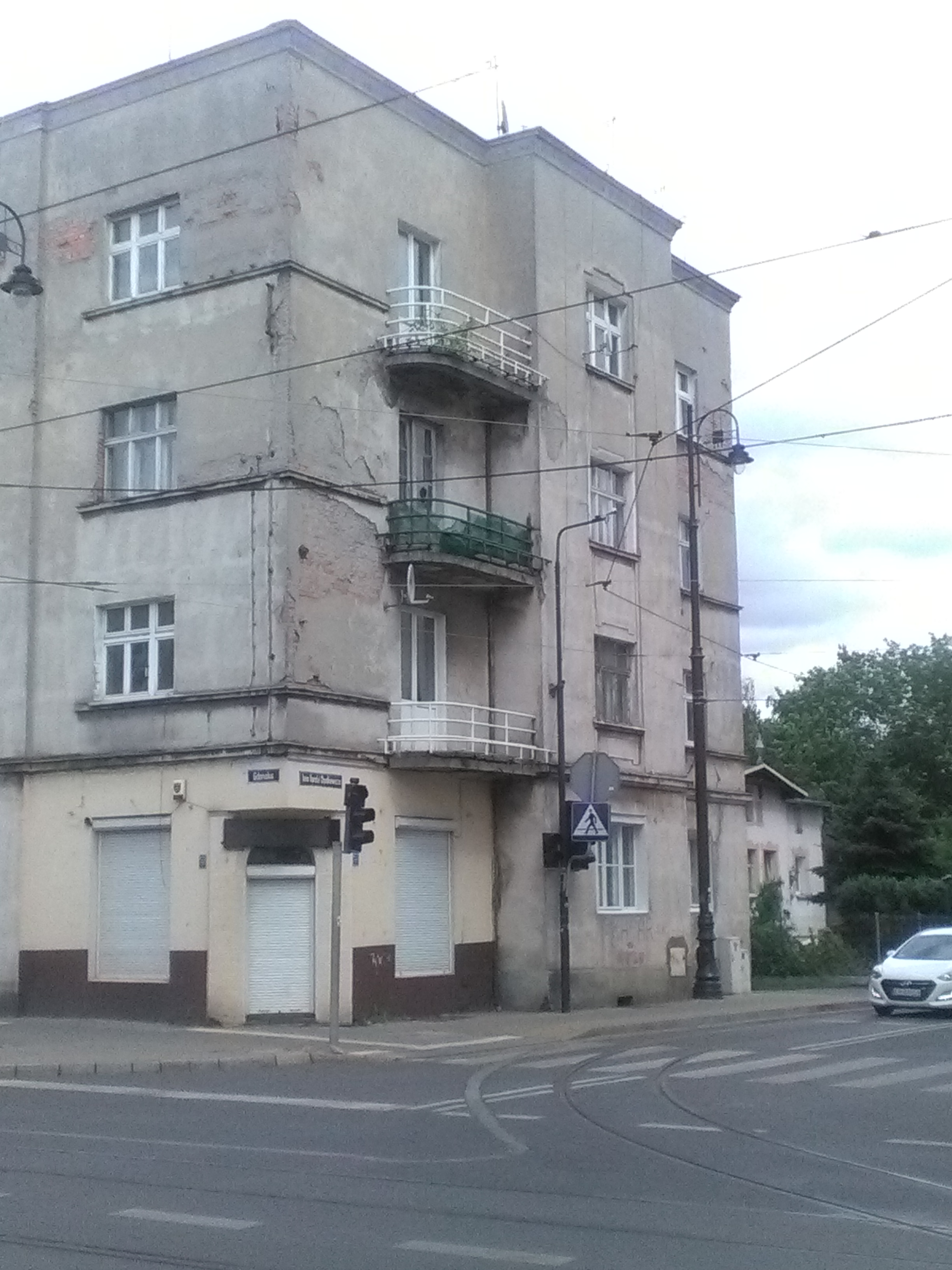
Elevation onto Chodkiewicza

=== Tenement at 2, corner with 98 Gdańska Street ===
Built 1932–1933 by Józef Grodzki

Modern architecture

This functionalist tenement, together with the opposite one at 100 Gdańska street, strongly contrasts with the ancient buildings of the main downtown thoroughfare. Renovated in the late 2010s, part of the original decor (door carpentry, metal balcony balustrades, ceramic tiles) is still preserved.

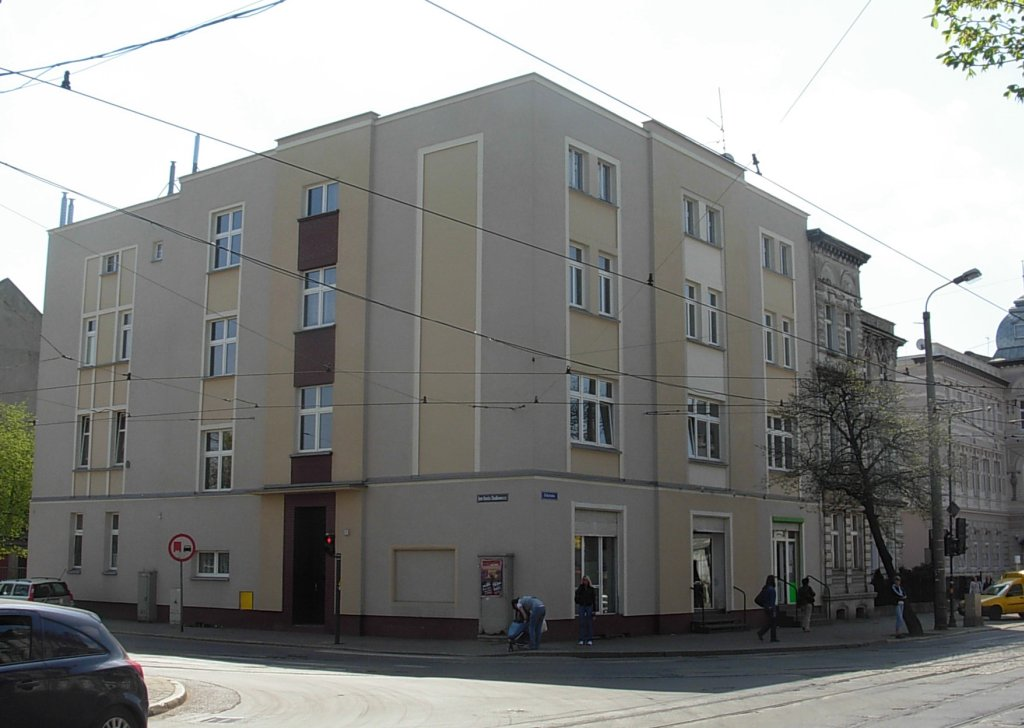
View from Gdańska street

=== Villa at 2A ===
1909–1910 presumably by Rudolf Kern

Landhaus style

Built well before the building at today's corner with Gdańska street, the house bore for a long time the address 120 Dantziger straße.

The villa, renovated in 2019, boasts early modern architecture style, with a bow window framed by geometric vertical lines. On a side wall, the construction date, Erbau im Jahre 1909–10, is inscribed inside a stuccoed coat of arms adorned by festoons.

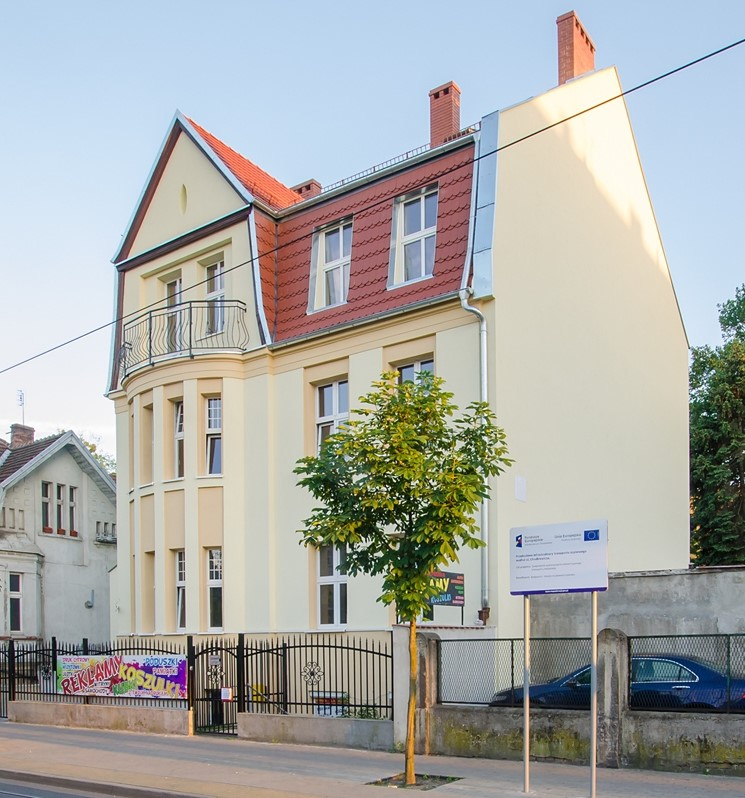
View from the street

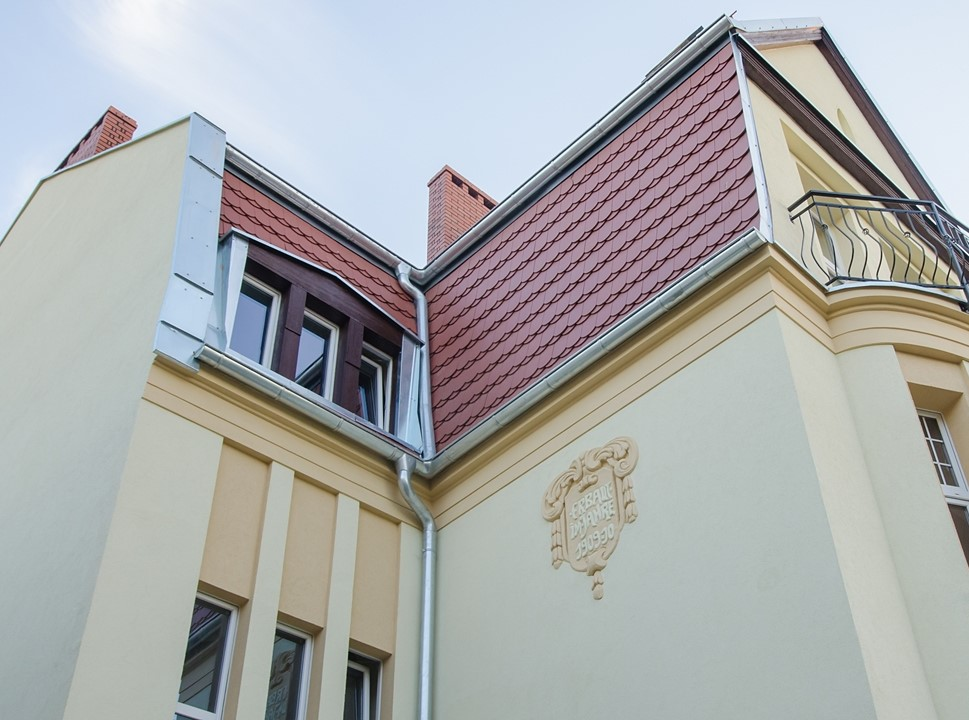
Detail with the construction date

=== Villa at 4 ===
1909–1910, by Erich Lindenburger

Landhaus style

The first landlord was Richard Von Colbe, a rentier. He lived there till the outbreak of WWII. in 1915, one of the tenants was Major General von Kundel, commander of the Brigade in Bromberg.

The house, though damaged, exhibits landhaus style, altered by early modern architecture:

- vertical plastered lines close the openings;
- a corner bay window is topped by a simile-roof;
- the roofing is marked by a 4-part gambrel roof.
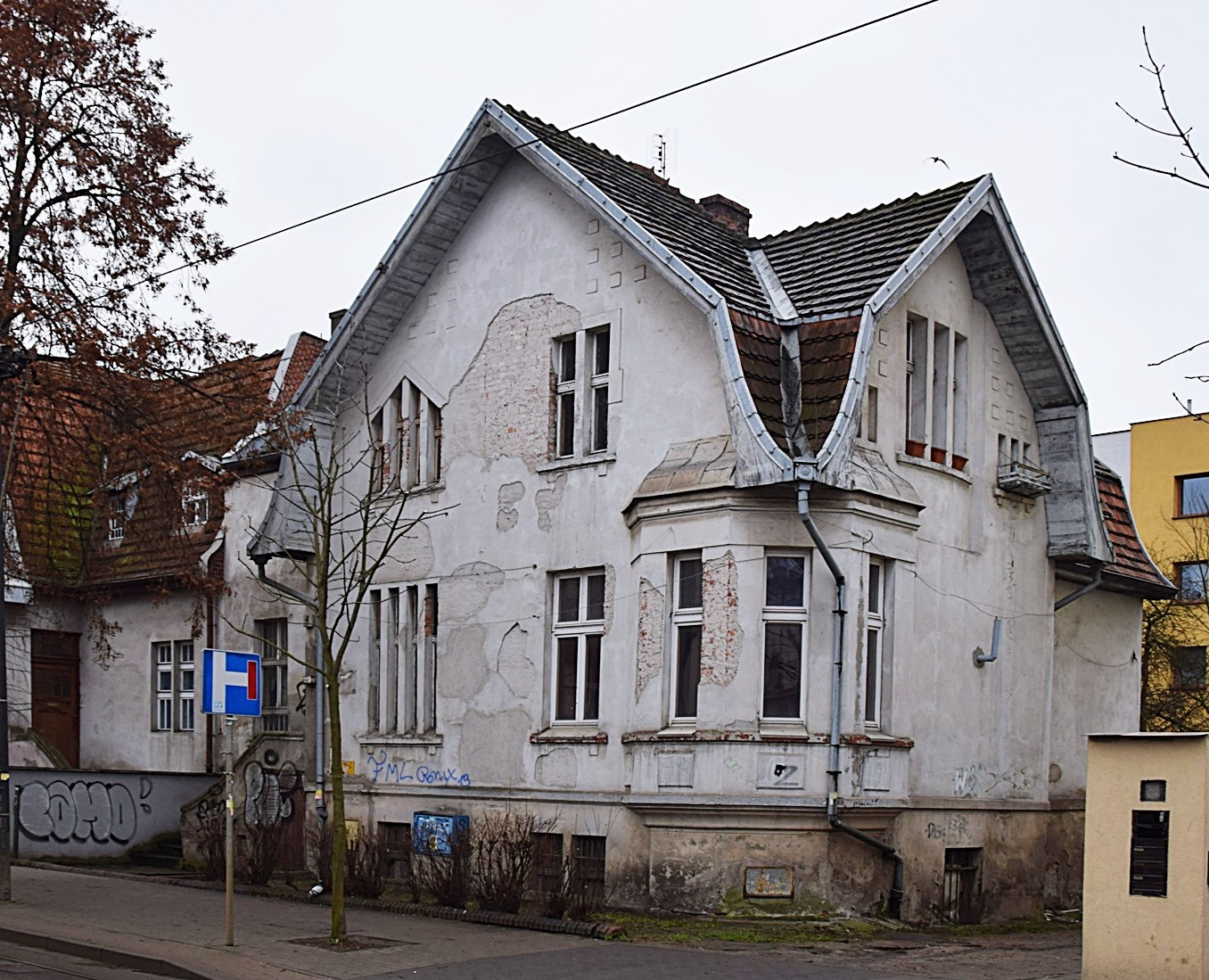
Villa at Nr.4

=== House at 5 ===
End of the 19th century

Landhaus style

One of the earliest building erected in the street, located at the time at 26 Sedan straße. The first owner was August Hempel who lived at 6 Peterson straße (today's Obrońców Bydgoszczy street). At the time, one of the tenant was the director of the abutting municipal brick factory (dismantled after the second world war).

The villa, renovated in 2019, displays nice characteristics of late Art Nouveau-early modern architecture. One can appreciate inside painted wallpapers characteristic for Bydgoszcz and a staircase adorned with mosaic. Outside, one can highlight the original metal and woodworking on the facade, as well as the preserved bartizan.

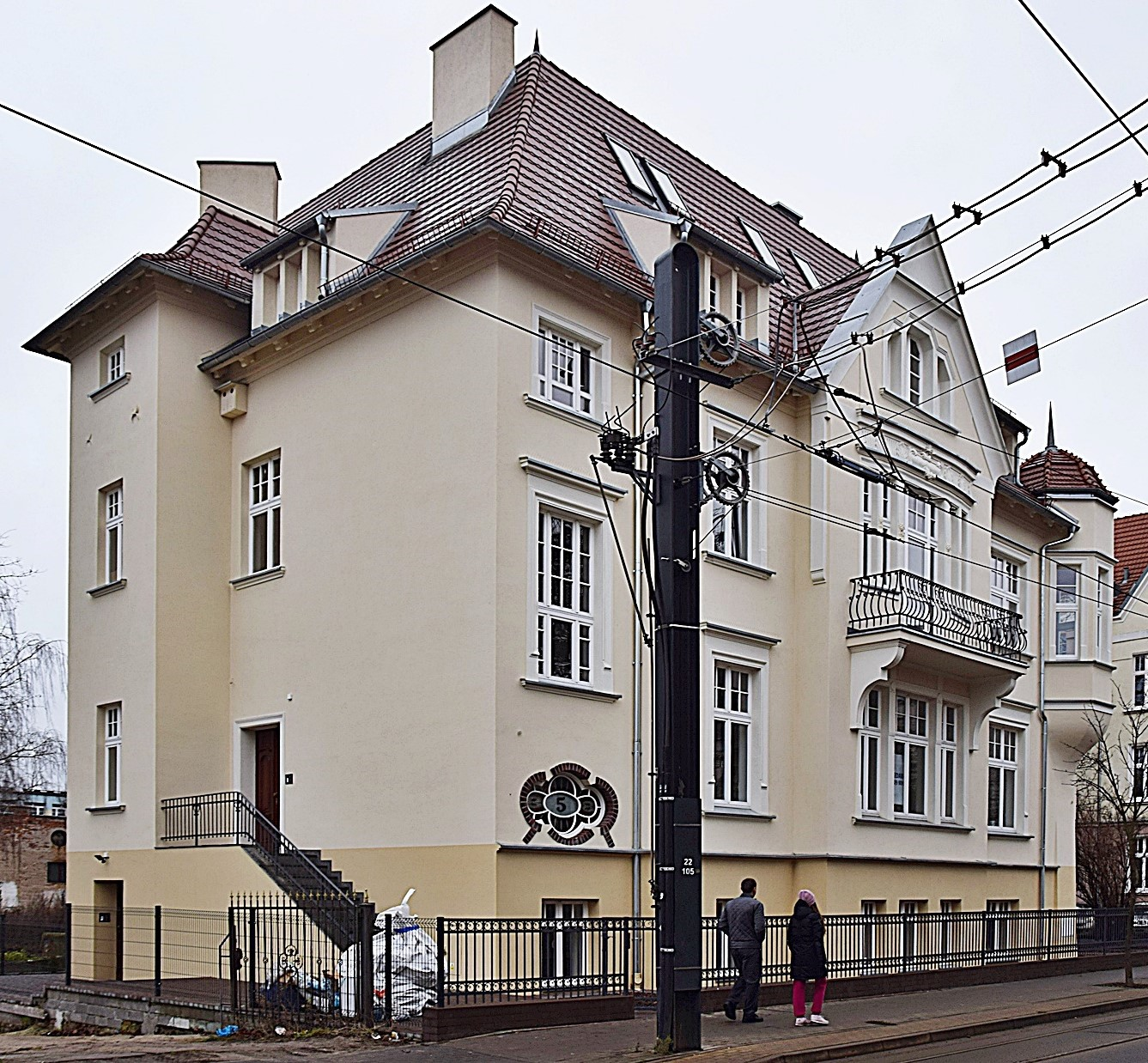
Villa at Nr.5

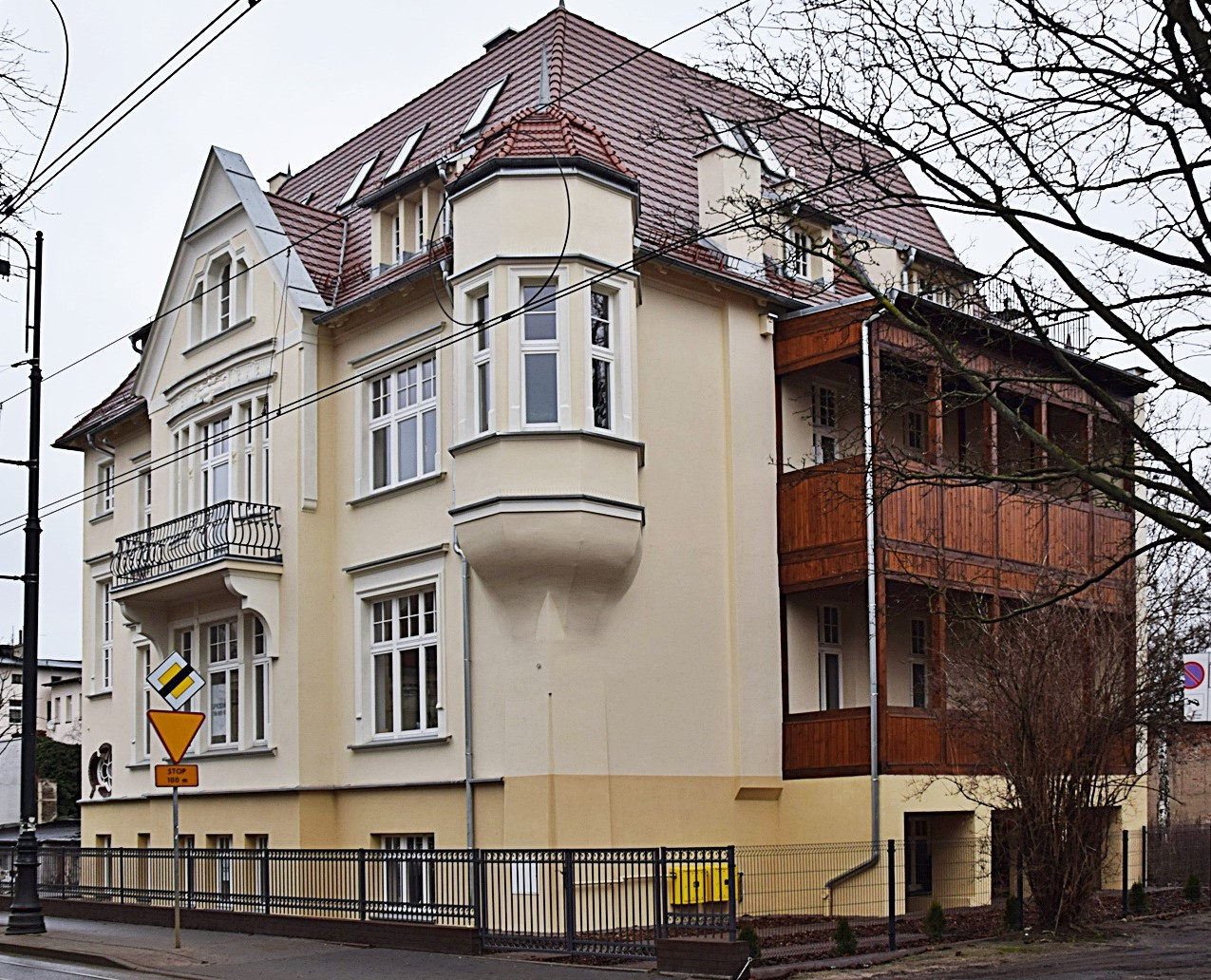
Eastern side view

=== Villa at 6 ===
1909–1910, by Erich Lindenburger

Landhaus style

Karl Magdaliński, a land owner, was the first proprietor of the house.

Erich Lindenburger designed the villa as a different version of the one at Nr.4: a larger gambrel roof, a small bow window on the ground floor and still some late-Art Nouveau/early modern architecture features.

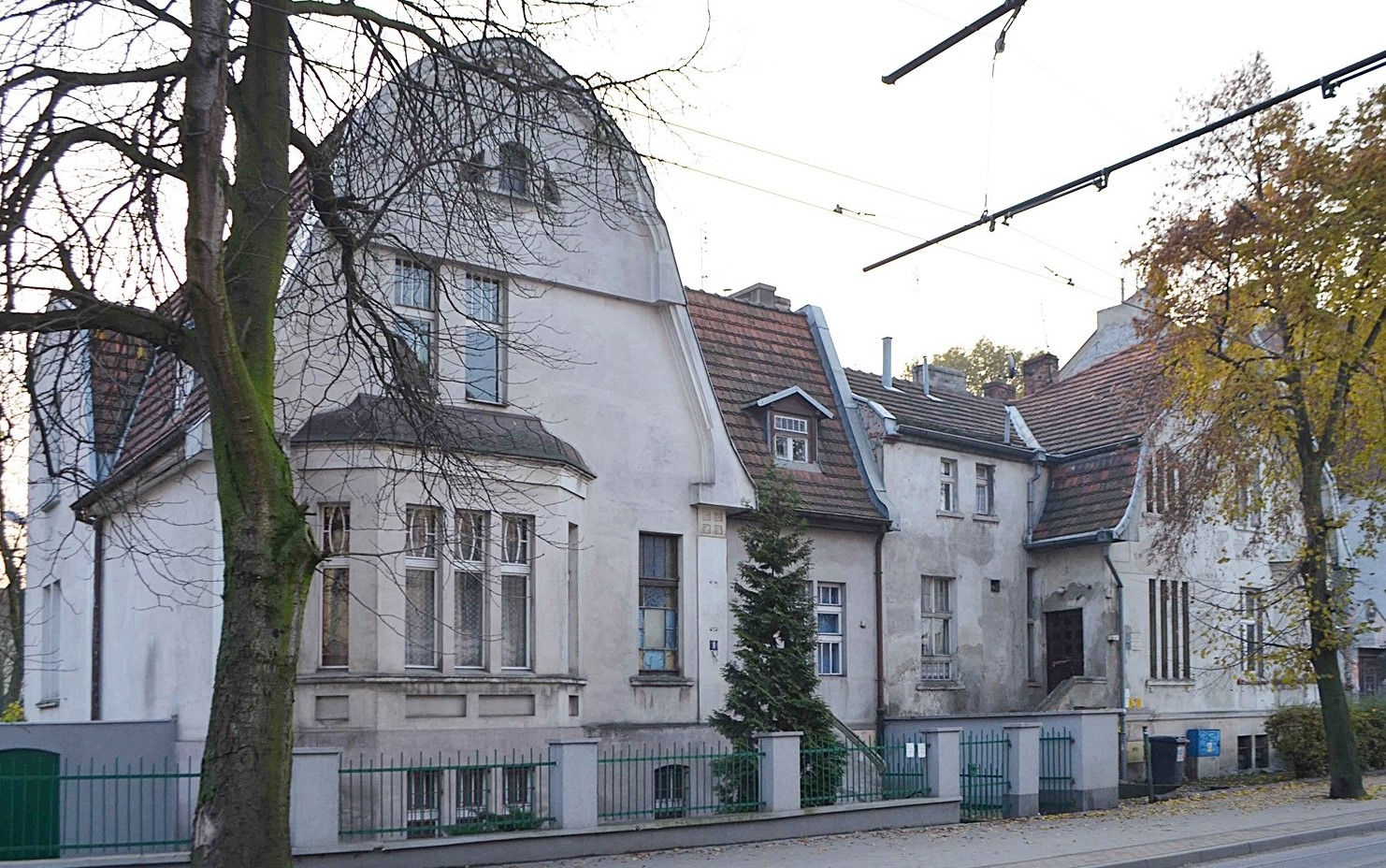
Villa at Nr.6

=== Tenement at 7 ===
Beginning of the 20th century

Art Nouveau

The plot owned by Albert Jahnke, a merchand, has been "under construction" for several years at the turn of the 20th century. In the late 1900s, Albert Jahnke has the edifice erected and put for rental. In the following years, the tenement moved under the property of Ludwig Kolwitz, the entrepreneur of the neighbouring metalwork industry. From 1909 on, the building housed Hermann Boetcher, also owner of a neighbouring metalwork industry. More recently, the local seat of the Alliance française moved in the tenement.

One can underlight in this large edifice the hip roofing, a corner bay window garnished with a stylized mascaron together with a vegetal stuccoed motif on top of one of the facades.

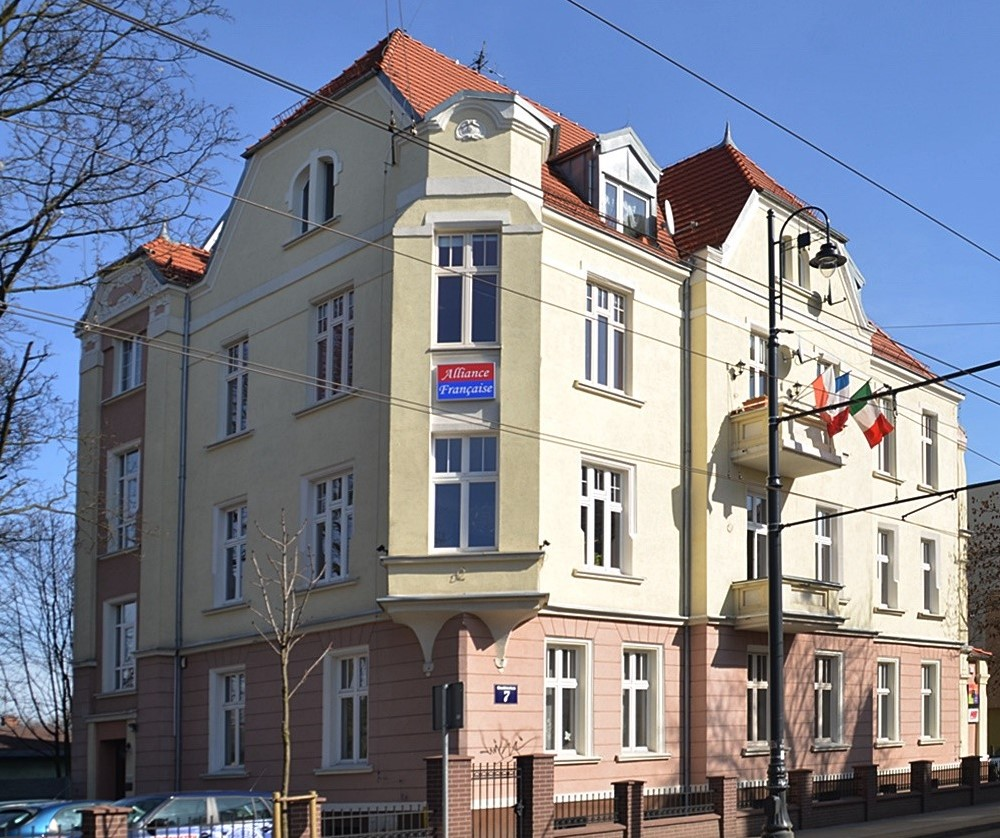
View of the tenement from the street

=== Villa at 8 ===
1911, by Alfred Schleusener

Late Art Nouveau-early modern architecture

The commissioner of the villa was Rudolf Kaufmann, a merchand. In the middle of the 1930s, one of the tenant was Jan Montowski, a gynecology surgeon at the Hospital for Infectious Diseases in Bydgoszcz (then called Szpital Św. Floriana Zgromadzenia Sióstr Miłosierdzia św. Wincentego a Paulo) on Świętego Floriana street. Jan Montowski soon became the director of the hospital before the war. Arrested by the Gestapo, he died in an unknown place and was pronounced dead on September 30, 1939. During WWII, the house was occupied by the Gestapo. In 1945, it was taken over by the NKVD and then by the Ministry of Public Security, better known as UB. This office arranged there a Police departement for children in the end of the 1970s, which closed in 2010. In January 2017, the city authorities decided to sell the facility: however, the case is still to be decided by the court since the owners opposed the municipal decision. The site has been entered in the city register of monuments.

The villa is in a bad state, waiting to be taken over by official proprietors. Alfred Schleusener designed a house with Art Nouveau hints (round corners roof, light stucco on facade pillars), but his mind was well oriented towards the then nascent trend of modern architecture.

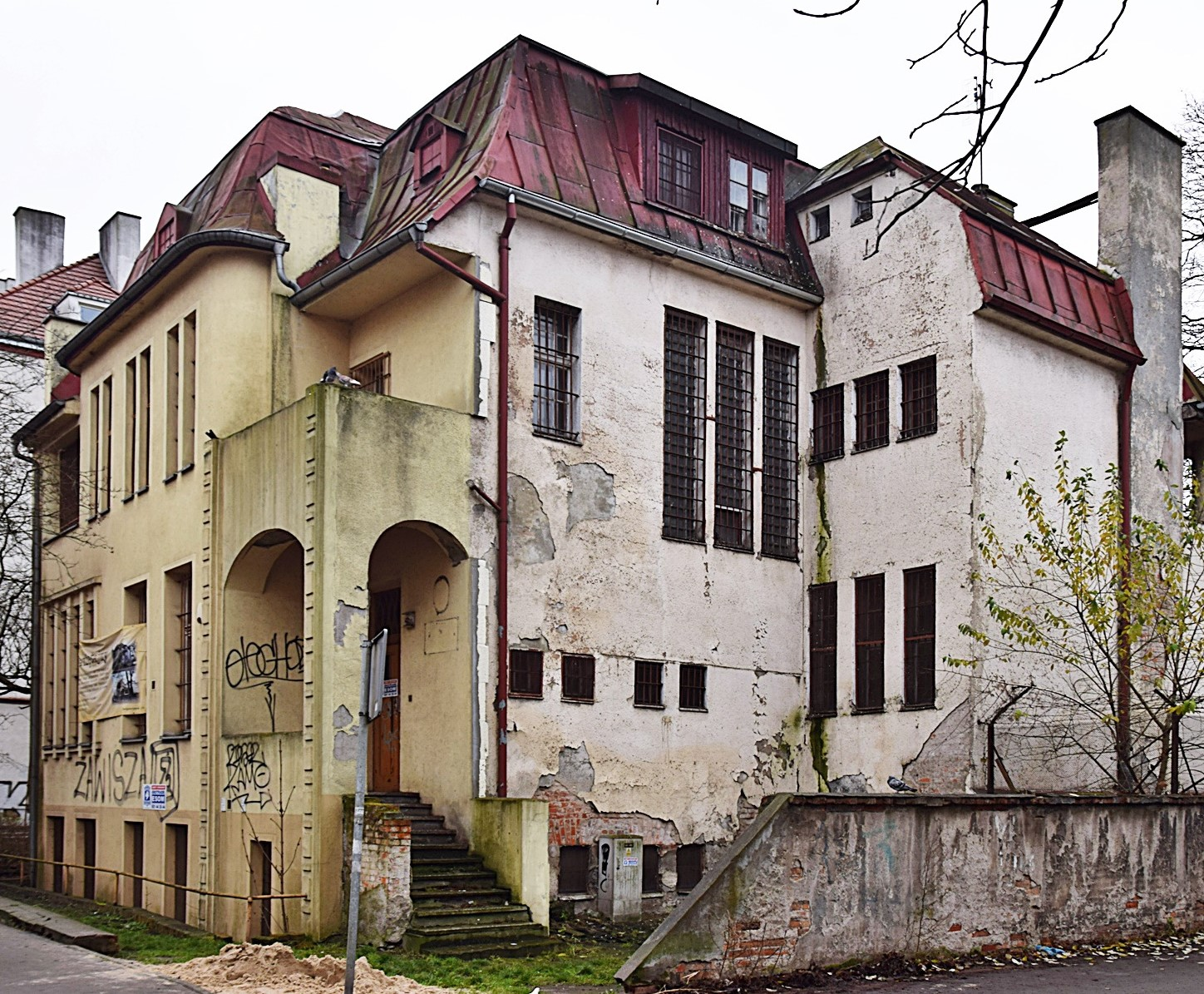
View of the villa from the street

=== Tenement at 14, corner with 26 20 Stycznia 1920 Street ===
Registered on Kuyavian-Pomeranian Voivodeship heritage list, Nr.A/1384 (September 16, 2008)

1907, by Rudolf Kern

Art Nouveau

The first landlord and building commissioner was Friedrich Fiedler, a merchant.

Nicely refurbished in 2016–2017, the tenement exhibits leasing Art Nouveau details with rosettes and mouldings. A superb round gable overlooking the terrace on top of the avant-corps is adorned with representative Art Nouveau motifs: a figure head, flanked by vegetal festoons. Likewise, the transom light over the entrance door is surrounded by a moulding with Art Nouveau features.

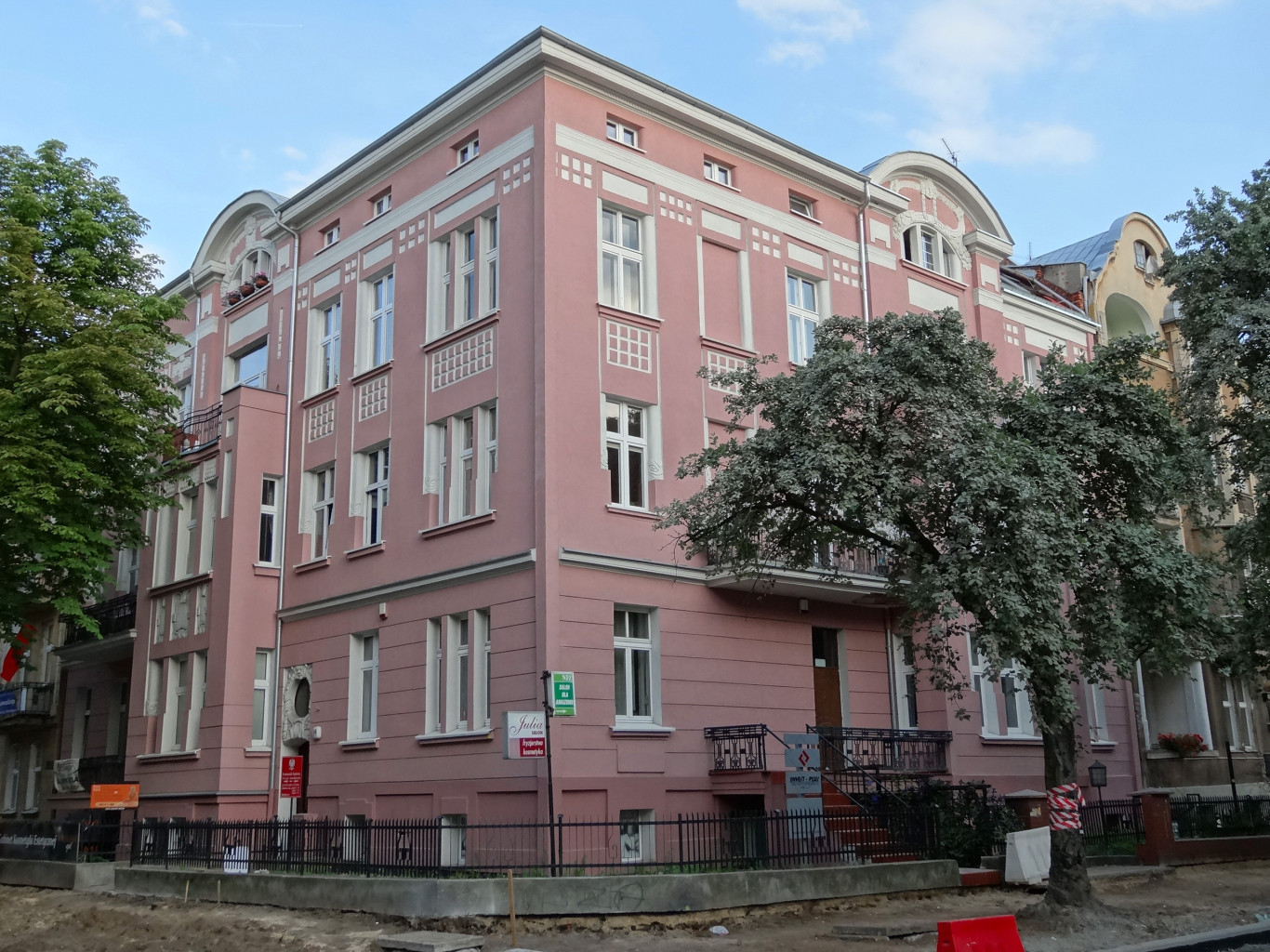
Frontages from street intersection

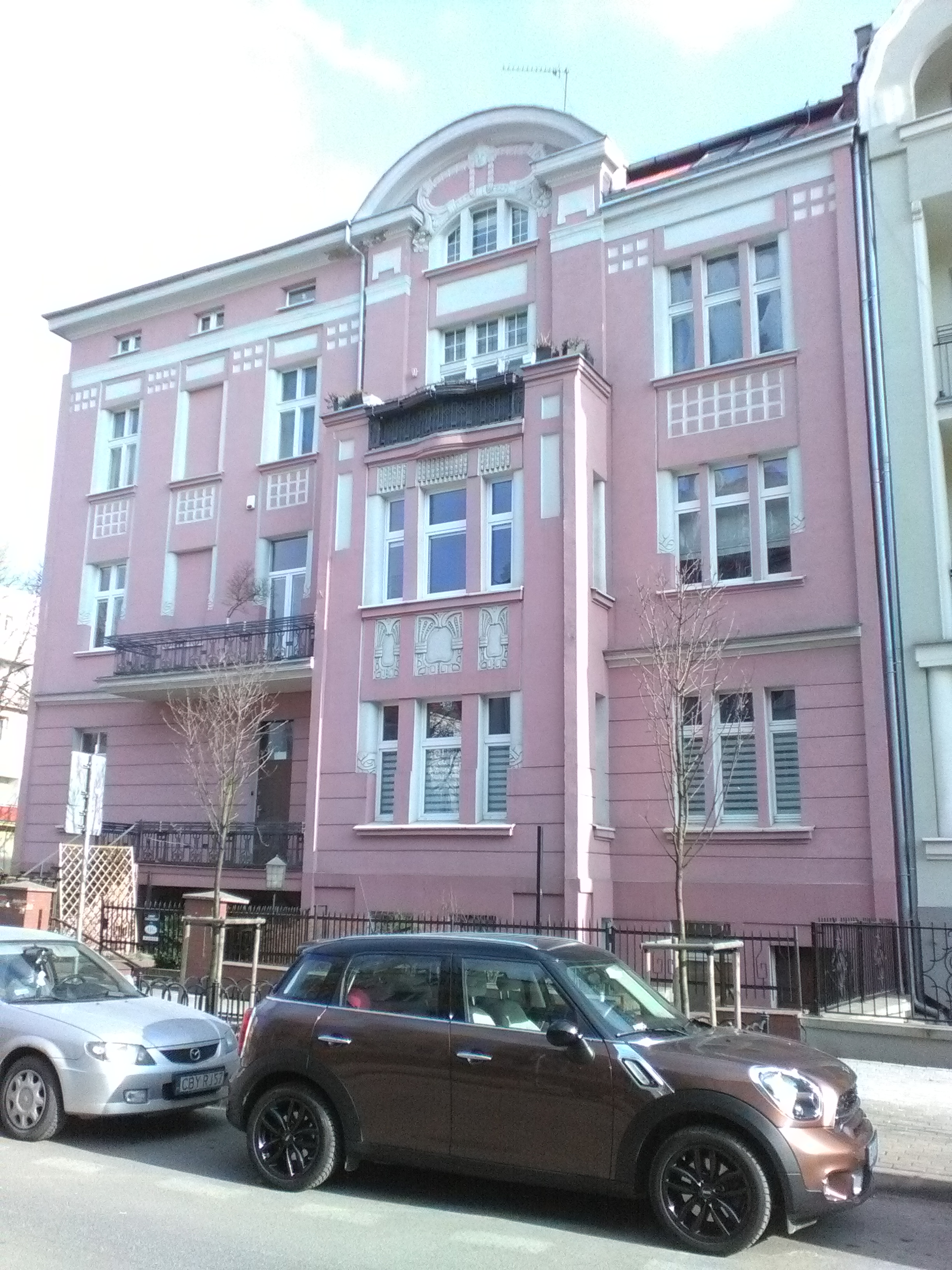
Facade on 20 Stycznia 1920 street

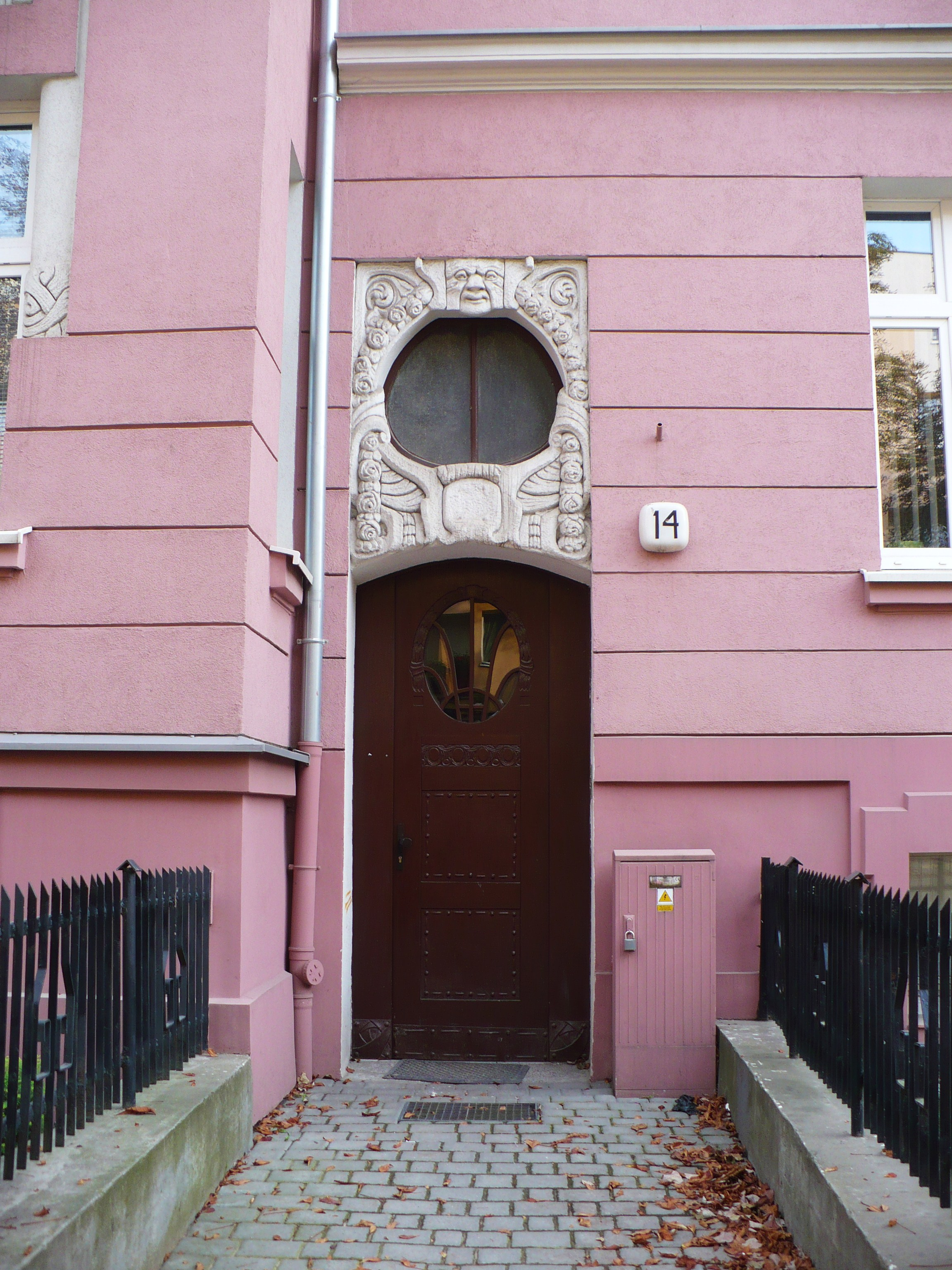
Decorated portal

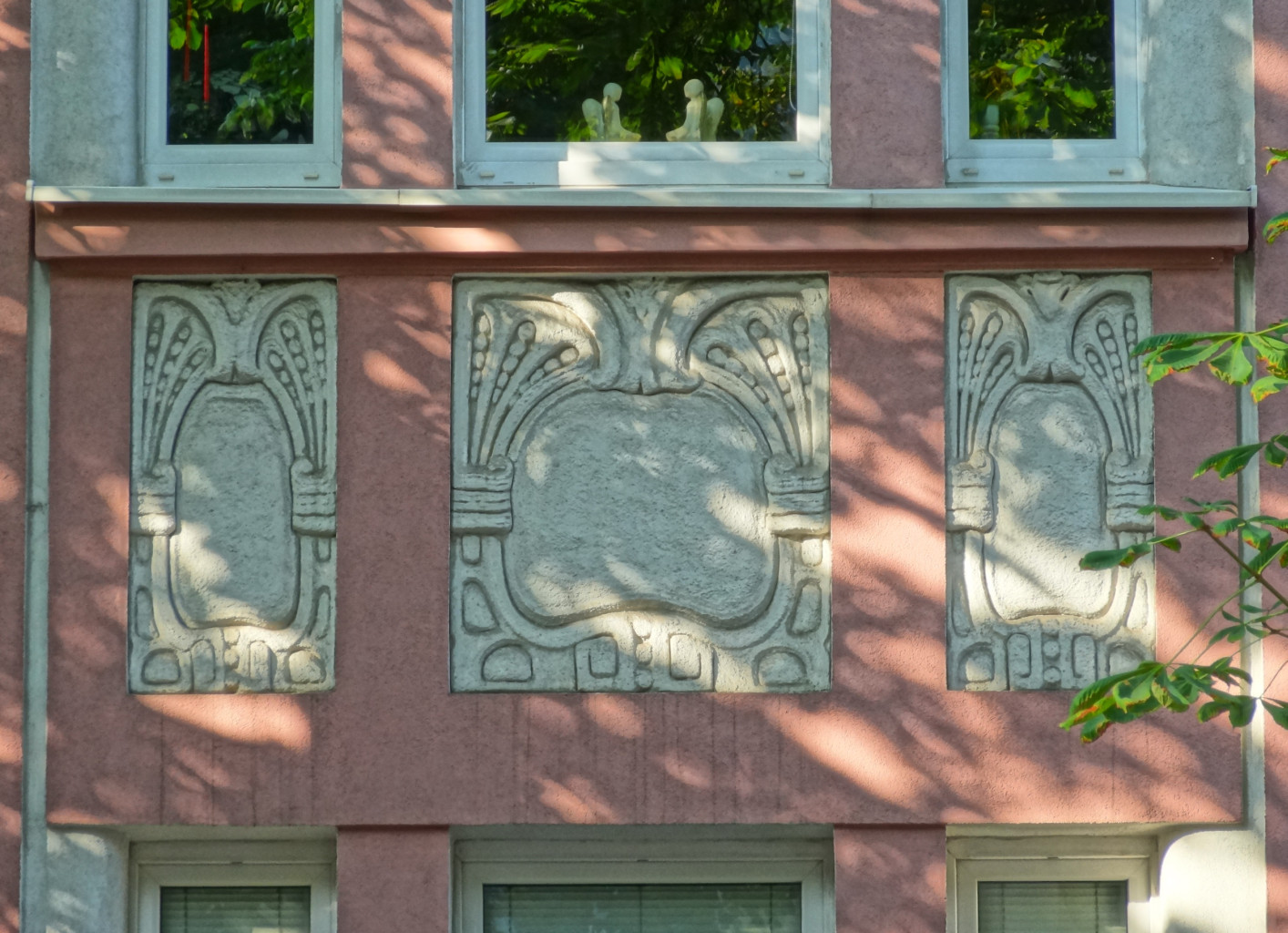
Cartouches

=== Tenement at 16 ===
1910–1911, by Johannes Cornelius

Art Nouveau

Friedrich Fiedler, merchand, owner of the abutting building at Nr.14, contracted another local architect for this project. Johannes Cornelius, at the time, had already designed two notable houses at 7 Józef Weyssenhoff Square in 1909–1910 and at 25 20 January 1920 street 1910. At the time, address was 37 Bleichfelde Weg. In the early 1920s, one of the tenants was Zakaria Bakradze, a Georgian officer who became a brigadier general of the Polish Army during the Second Polish Republic.

The tenement, refurbished in 2017, boasts plethora of Art Nouveau motifs. The facade teems with stuccoed forms and decoration, in particular in cartouches and on the transom over the entrance door.

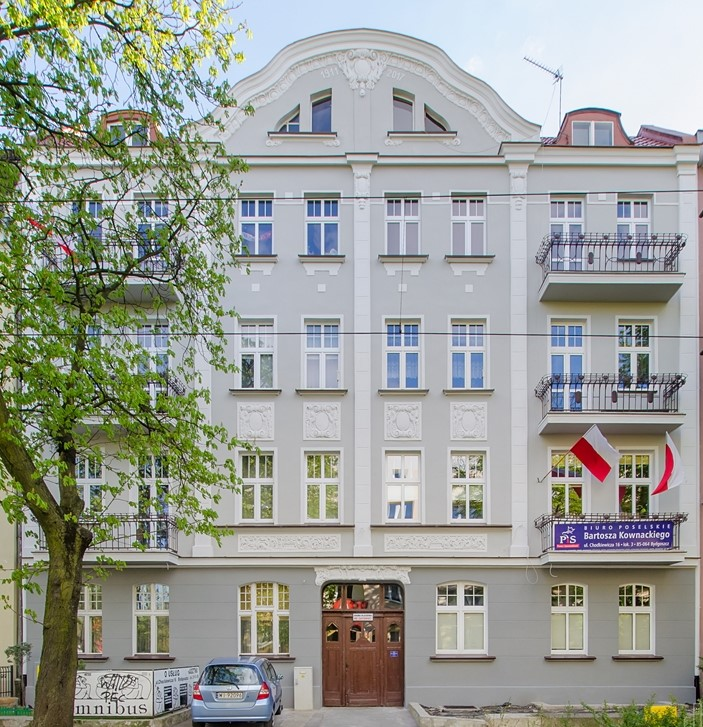
Main Facade on the street

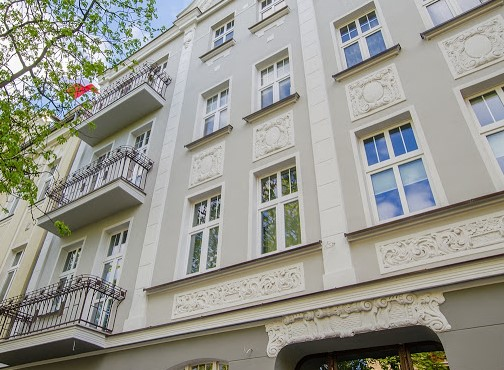
Elevation detail

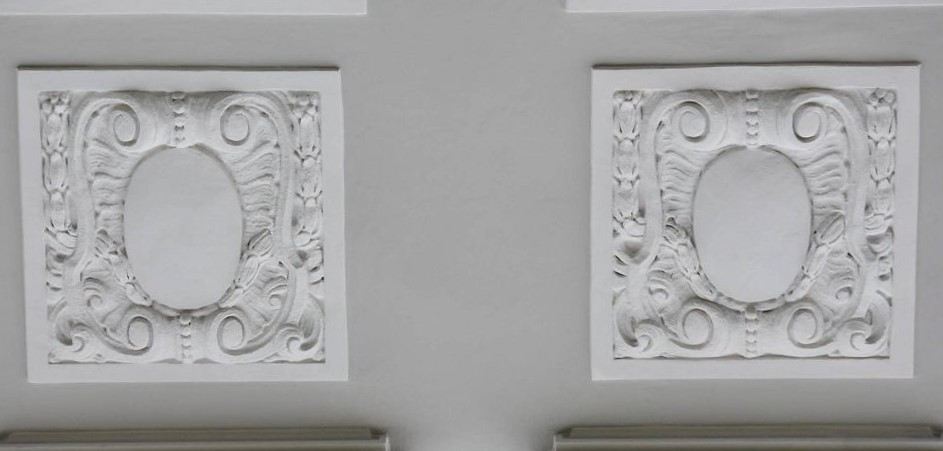
Detail of the cartouches

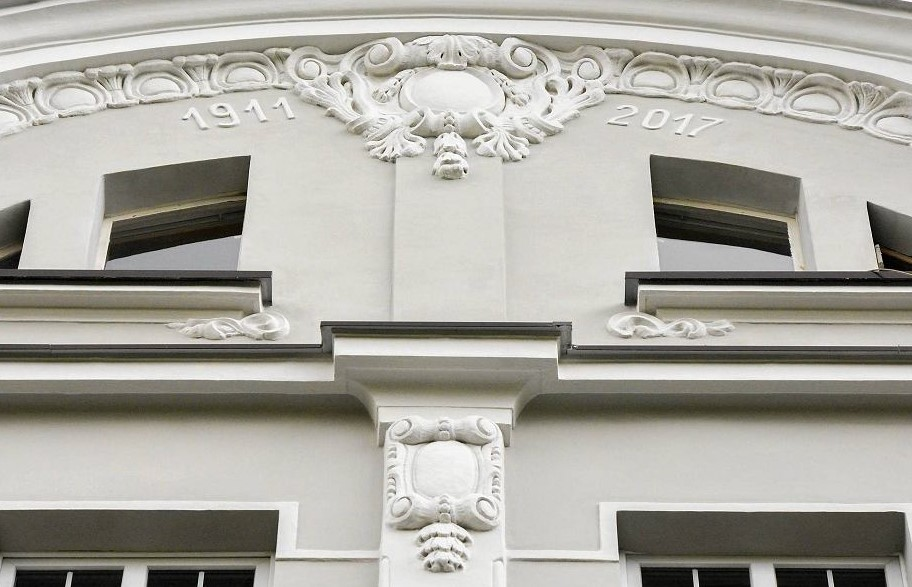
Detail of the frontage pediment

=== Tenement at 18 ===
1911–1912, by Alfred Mielke

Art Nouveau

The first landlord, Paul Krüger, was a hair dresser by trade.

Restored in 2007, the building displays Art Nouveau style with floral and vegetal motifs placed on the wall as well as on the two bay windows. One can highlight the delicate stuccos (with a putto) above the main entrance and the wrought iron grille of the street entrance.

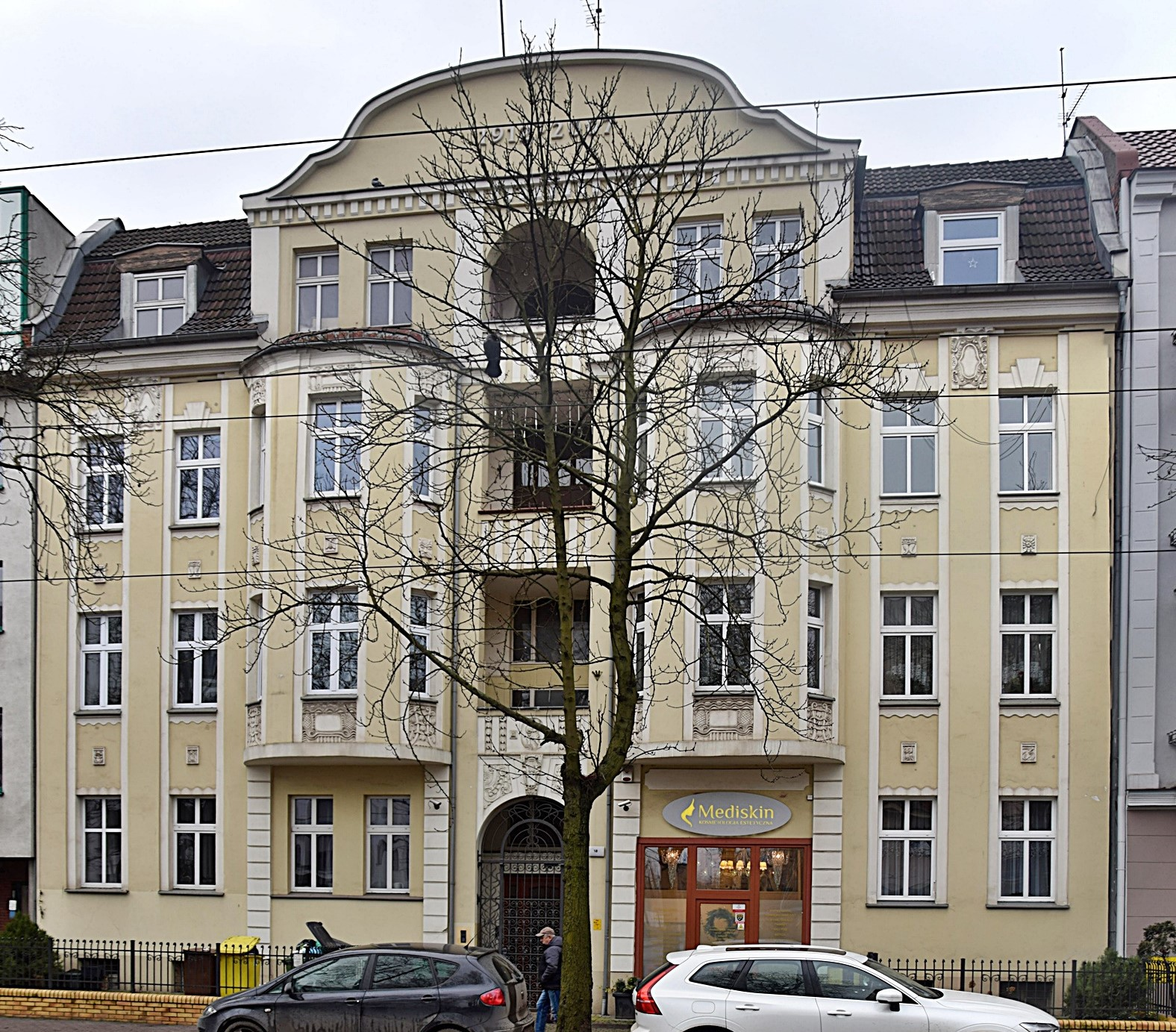
Main elevation

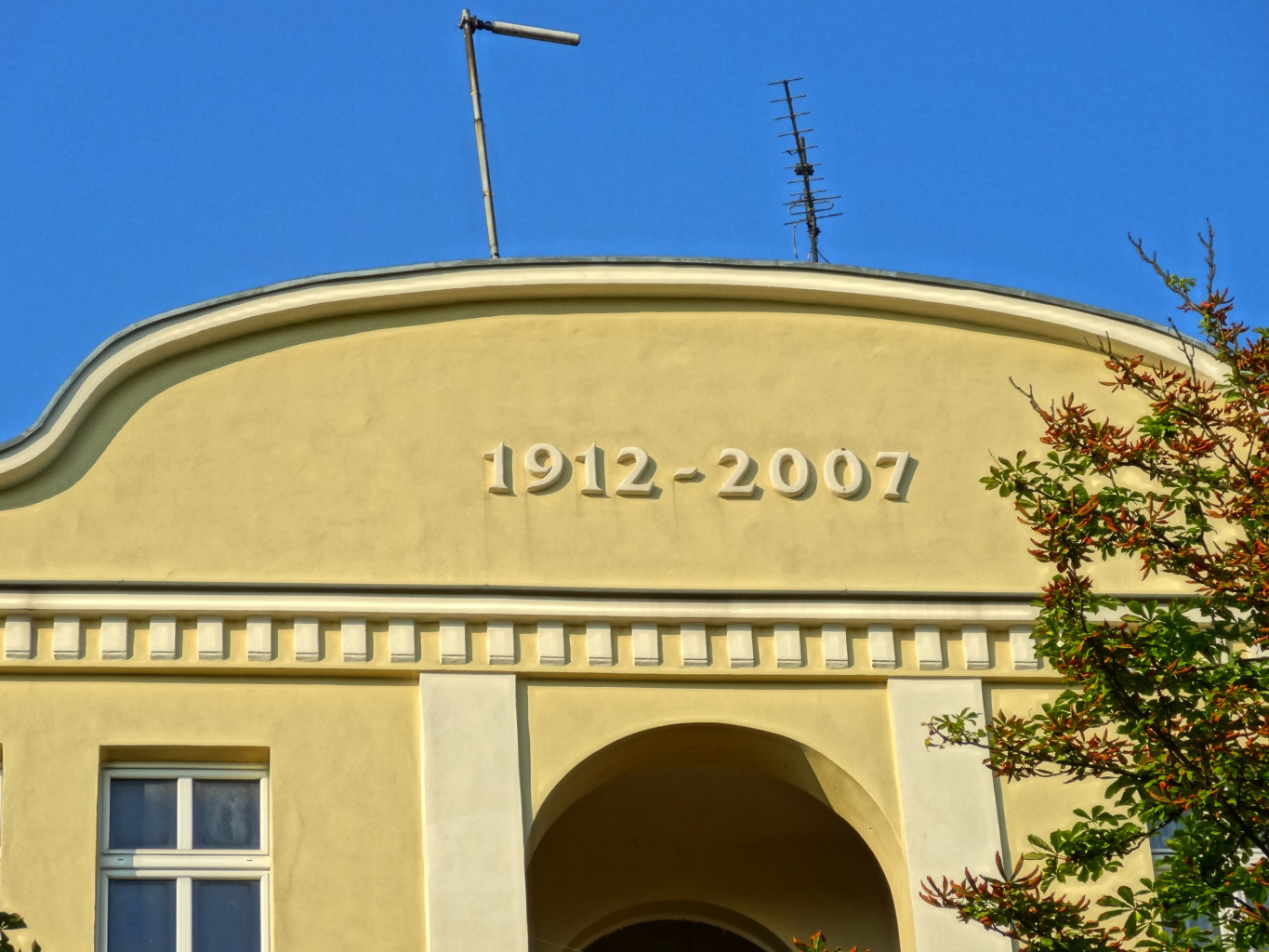
Detail of the facade pediment

=== Buildings at 19 ===
1910s

Industrial architecture

In the early 1910s, Ludwig Kolwitz set up a metalworking factory at 19/21 Bleichfelde Weg (today's Nr.19). He expanded his premises by taking over buildings at Nr.17/18 (today's 15/17), owned by Hermann Boettcher. The latter had moved his business in the tenement he had acquired at 40 Danziger straße.

Kolwitz developed his activity along the street with large warehouses extending north of the avenue. Kolwitz industry operated till the outset of WWII. After 1945, only two buildings remain: those are still standing today. In the backyard of the premises, a real estate project is developed for a completion in 2020.

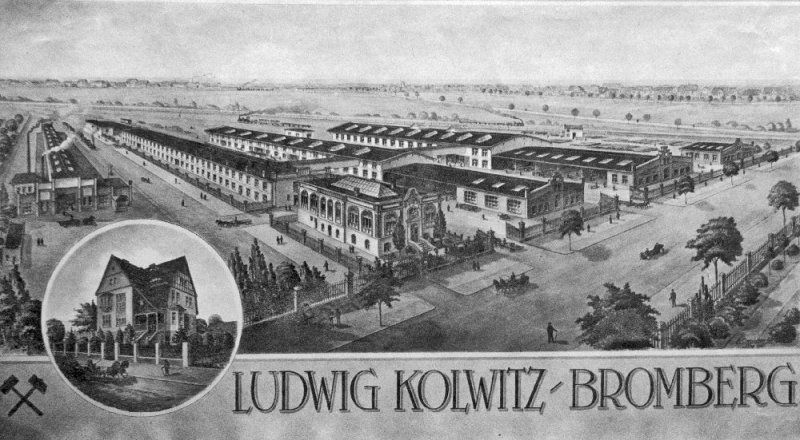
View of the Ludwig Kolwitz factory ca 1900s

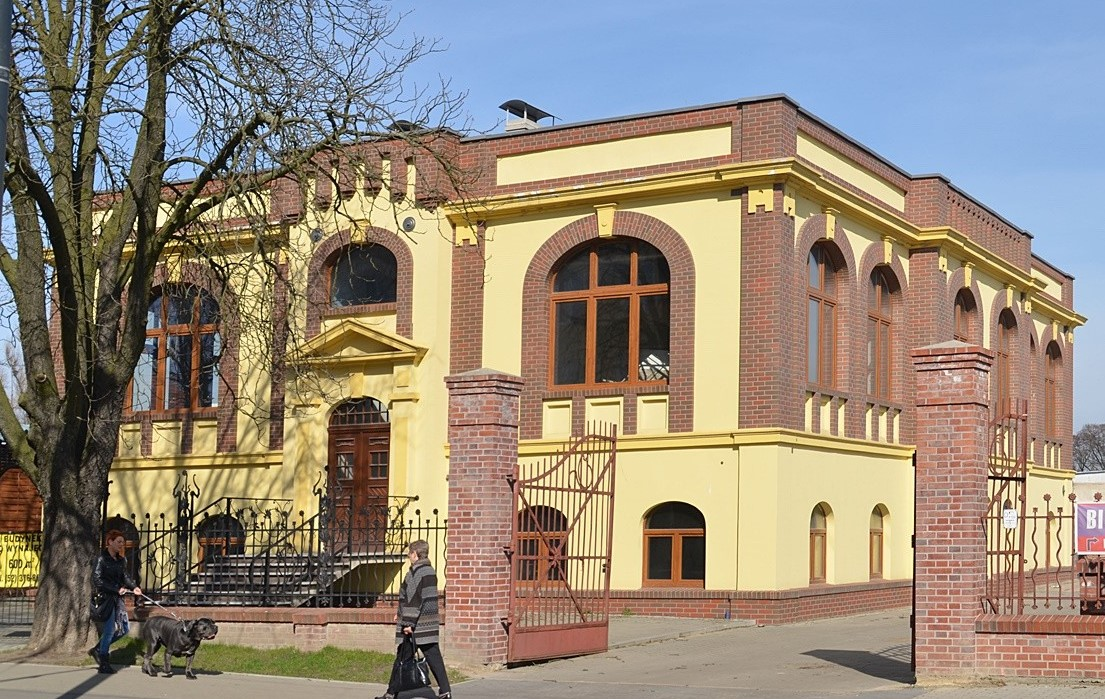
One of the Kolwitz buildings at 19 Chodkiewicza in the 2010s

=== House at 21 ===
Registered on Kuyavian-Pomeranian Voivodeship heritage list, Nr.743200-A/1575 (November 30, 2010)

1903

The commissioner of the edifice was the agricultural union (German: landwirtschaft verein) which used it as its seat till the start of WWII. At the time, the house was located at 57 Hauptweg (then 1/2 Kurfürsten straße), in Bleichfelde commune. In 1908, a restaurant was housed there, run by Paul von Karczewski. In 1917, Paul Karczewski (who dropped the "von"), moved to 40 Rinkauerstraße (today's 58 Pomorska Street) and opened there restaurant Germania.

The building is nowadays managed by the Kazimierz Wielki University (or UKW for Uniwersytet Kazimierza Wielkiego w Bydgoszczy).

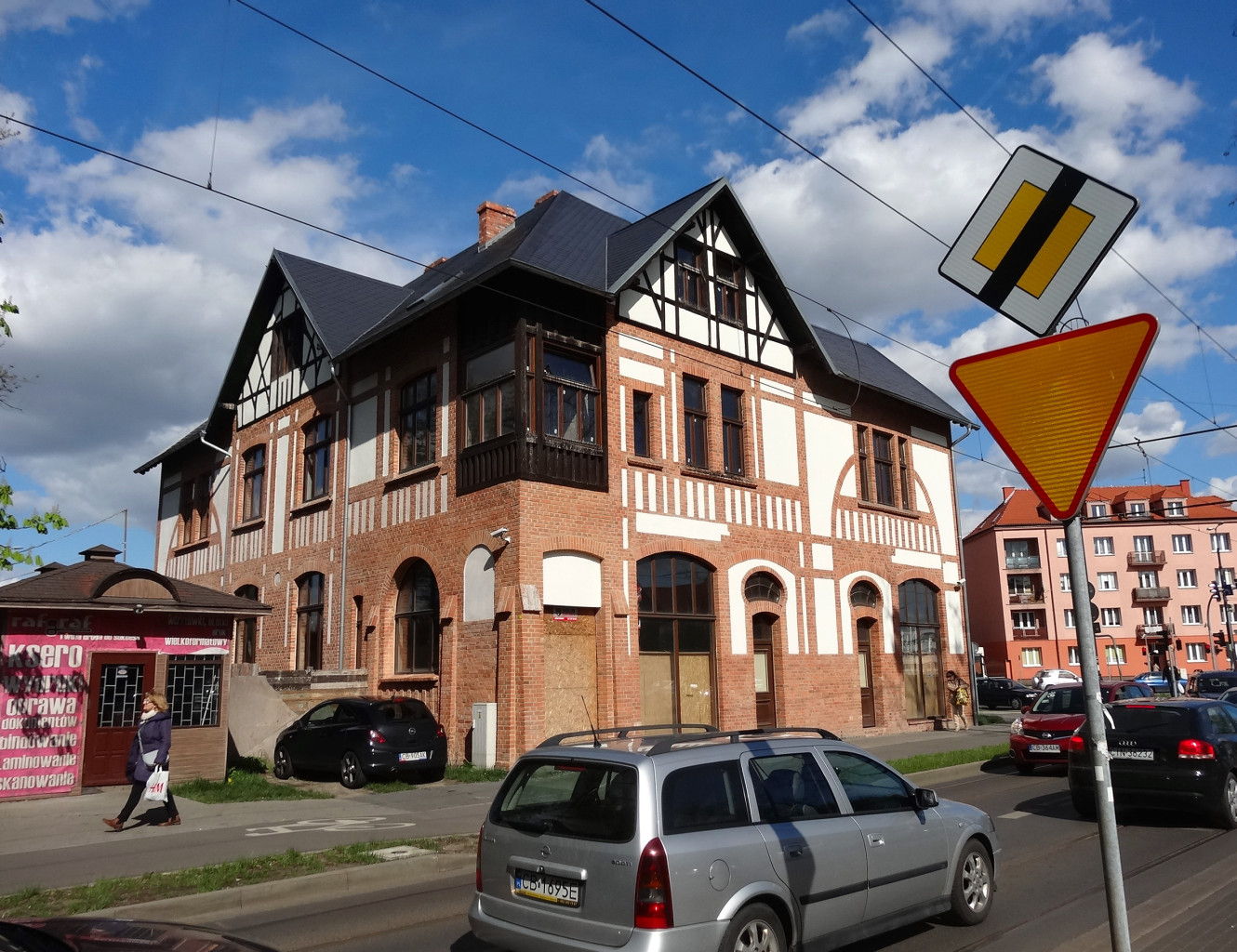
Current view from the street

=== Tenement at 22, corner with 23 Paderewskiego street ===
1903–1904, by Rudolf Kern

Eclecticism and Art Nouveau

The commissioner of this tenement was an investor, Julius Berger, who also funded other buildings in the street. The first landlord was a merchant, Mr Lange, who never lived there.

Both facades combine eclectic-neo-classical style (symmetry in the openings, corner bay window), and Art Nouveau features (vegetal motifs, rosettes, festoons, curved shape decoration inside cartouches).

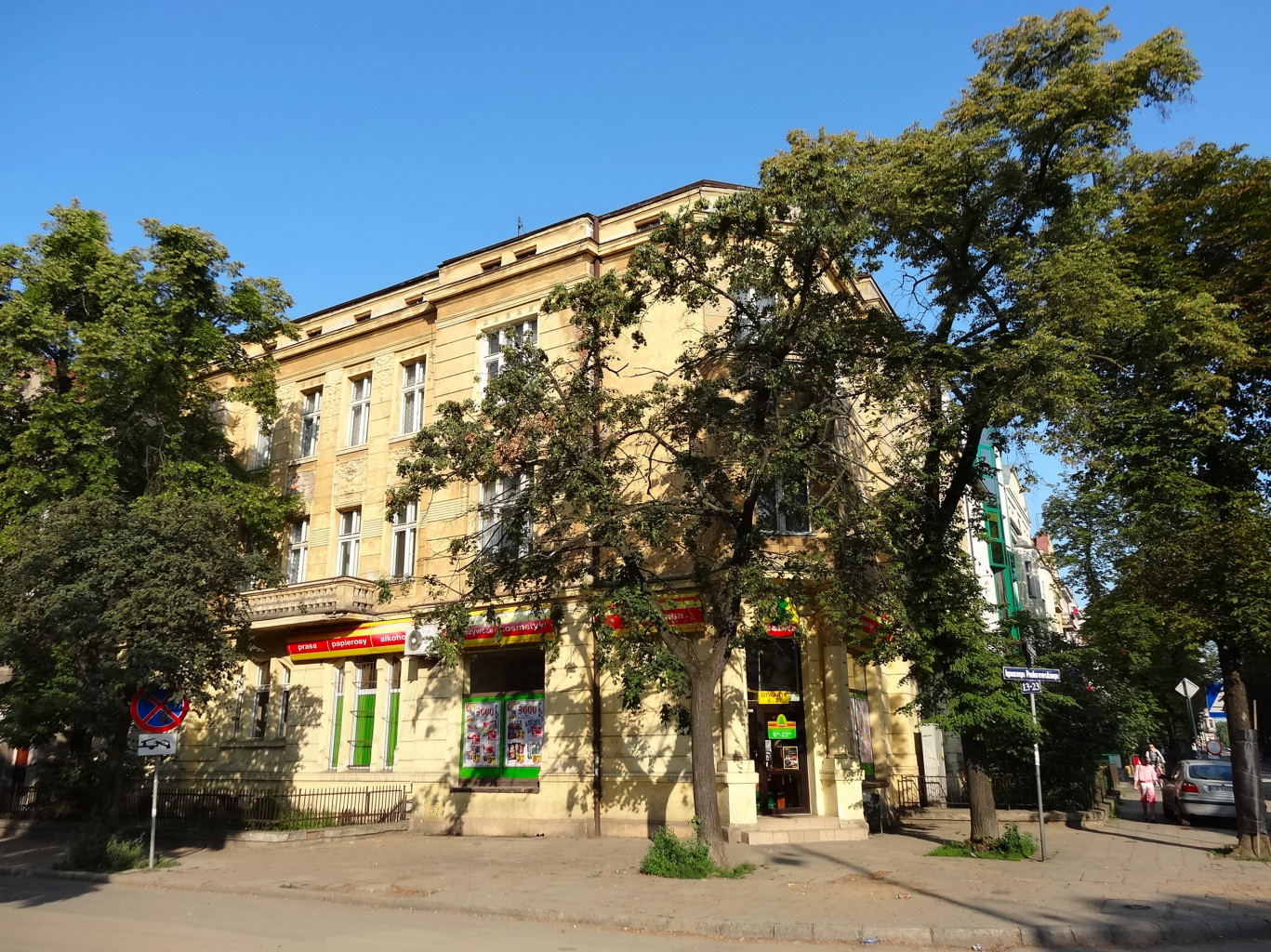
View of both frontages from the street

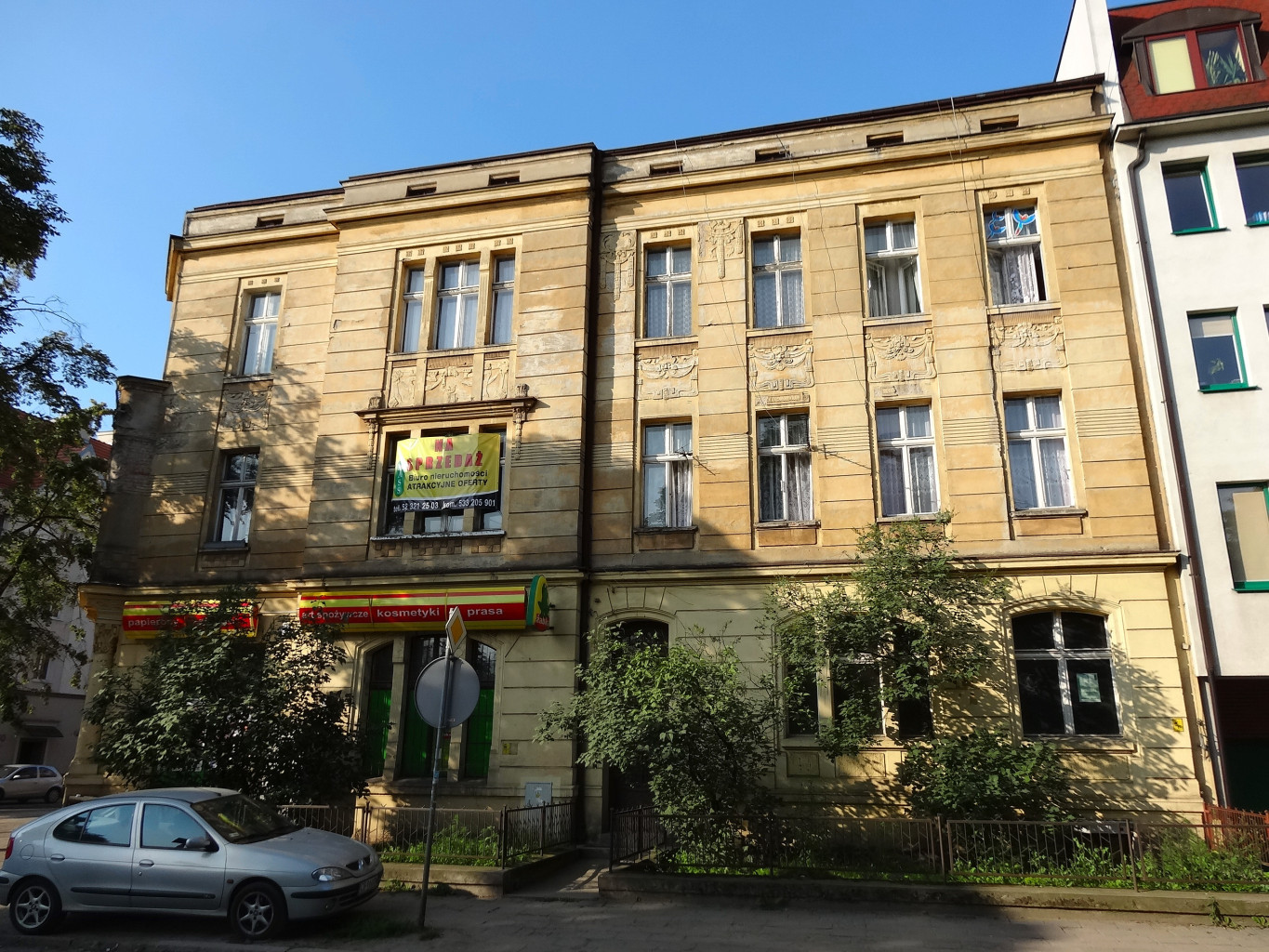
Elevation on Chodkiewicza street

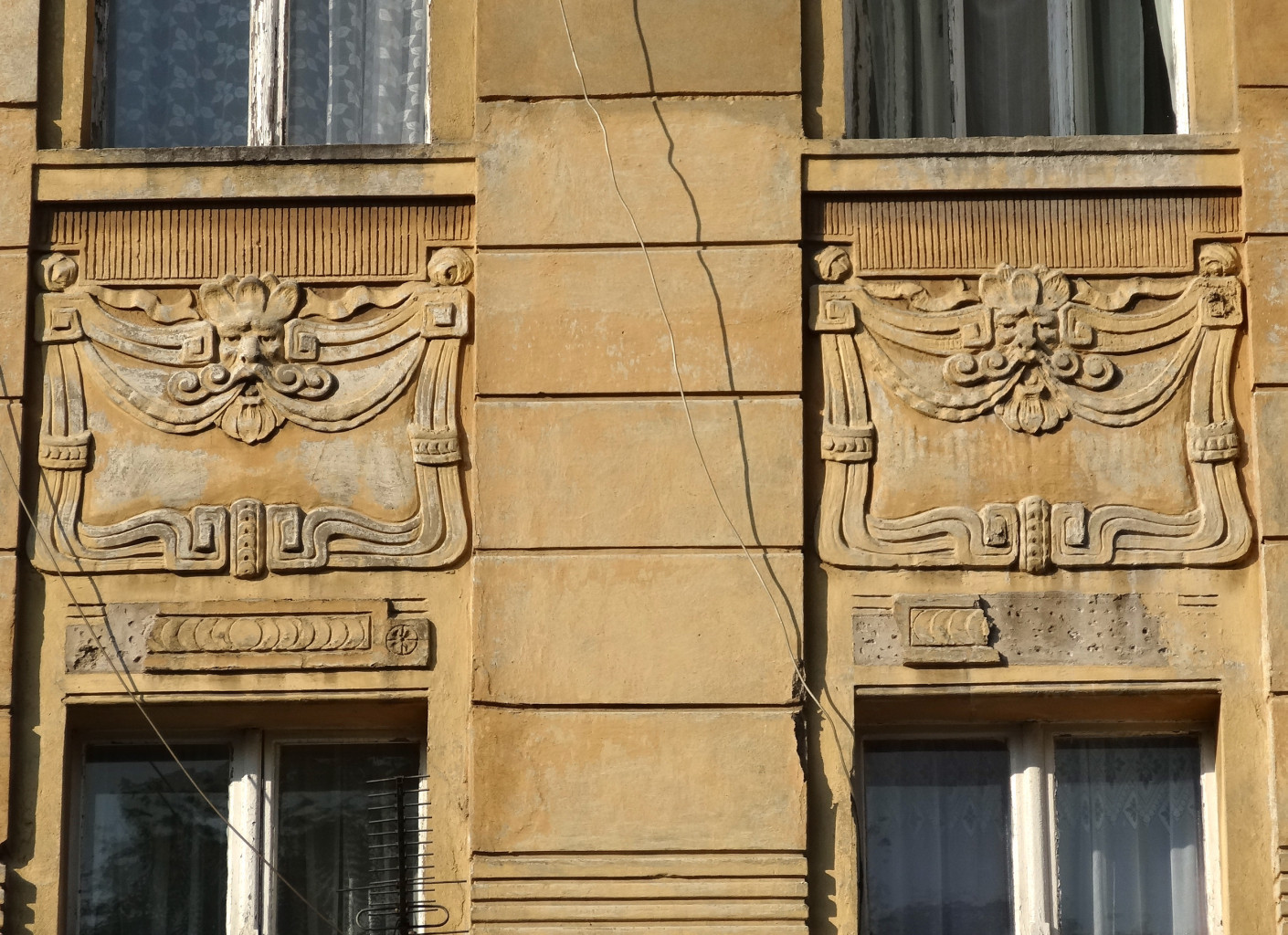
Mask motif in cartouches

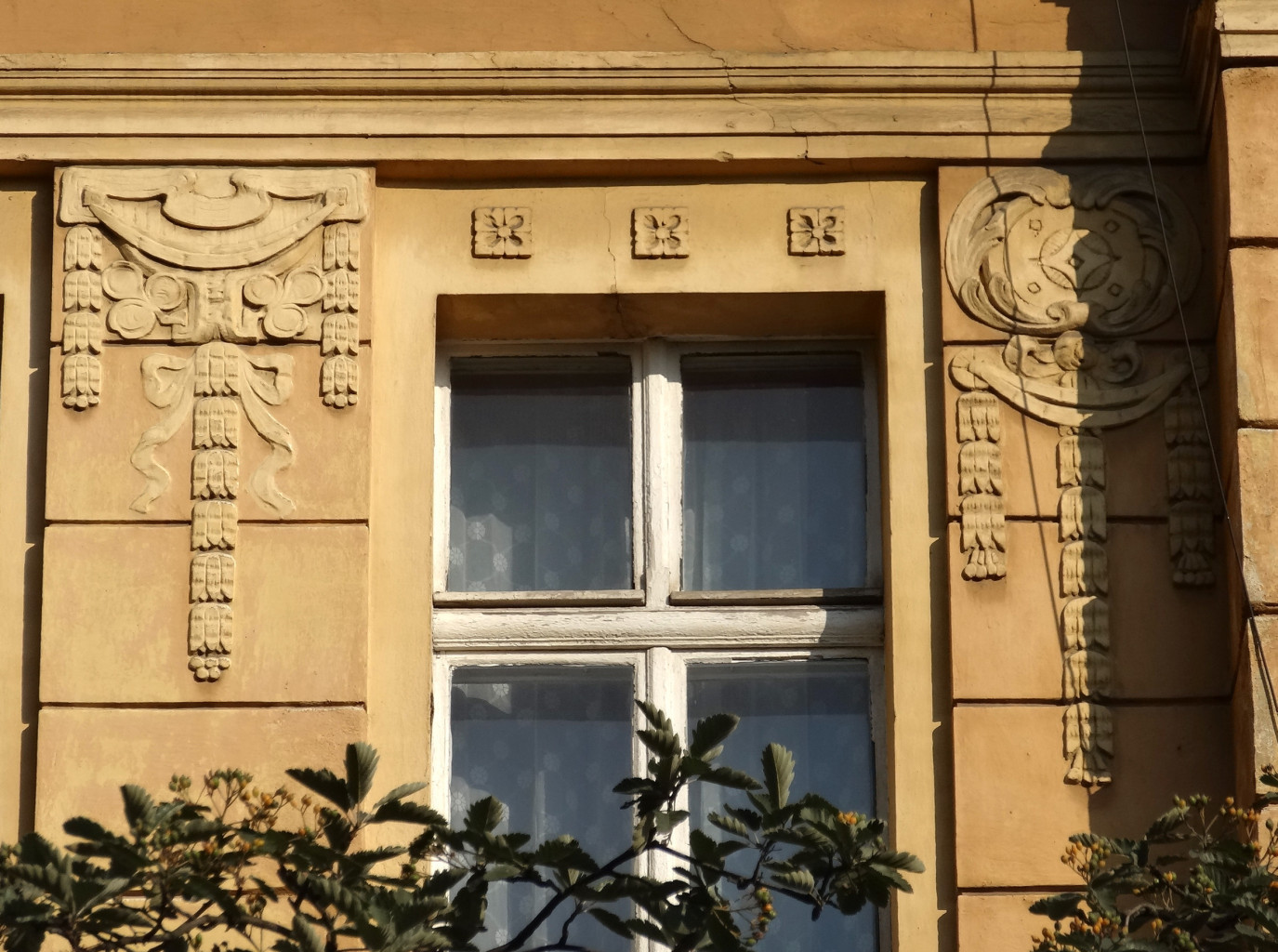
Vegetal festoons and motifs of the facade

=== Villa at 4 Niemcewicza street, corner with Chodkiewicza ===
1913

Late Art Nouveau

The villa 1 was ordered by Paul Eckert, co-owner of the Ludwig Kolwitz Company seating at Nr.19. At the time, it was located at 1 Lessing straße. The house sits at the back of the Botanic garden of the university Casimir the Great, which was then the Arboretum.

The building offers Art Nouveau details (cartouches), mixed with early modernist features together with wooden elements (including wattle and daub). The gambrel roof is worth noticing.

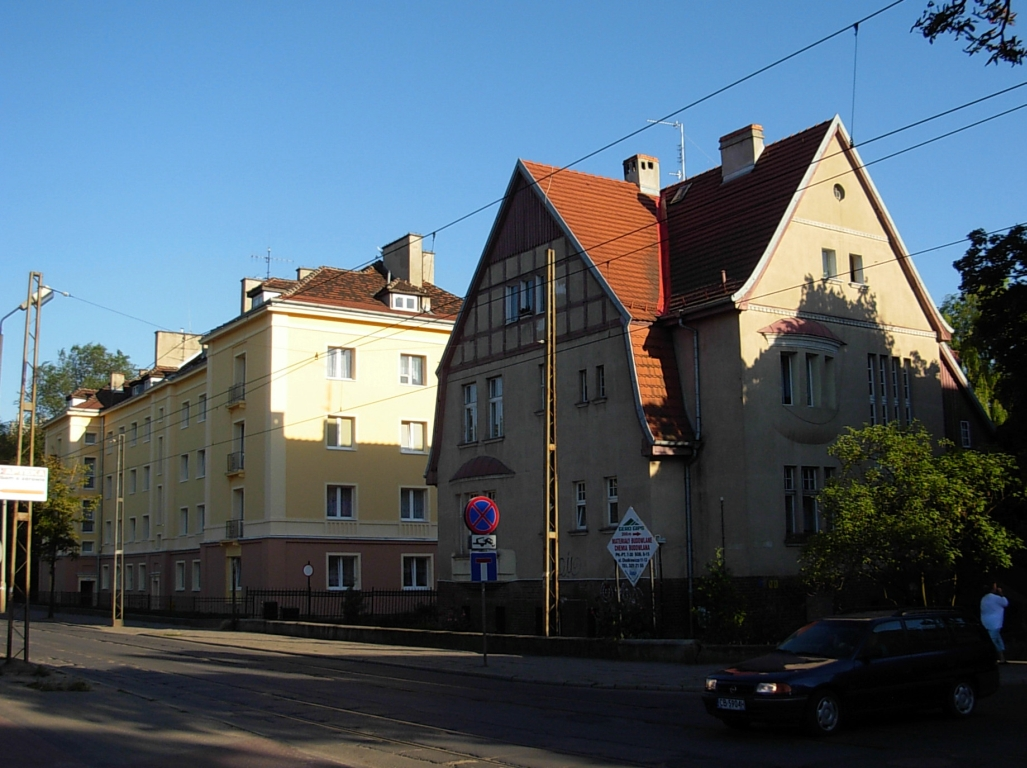
View from Chodkiewicza street

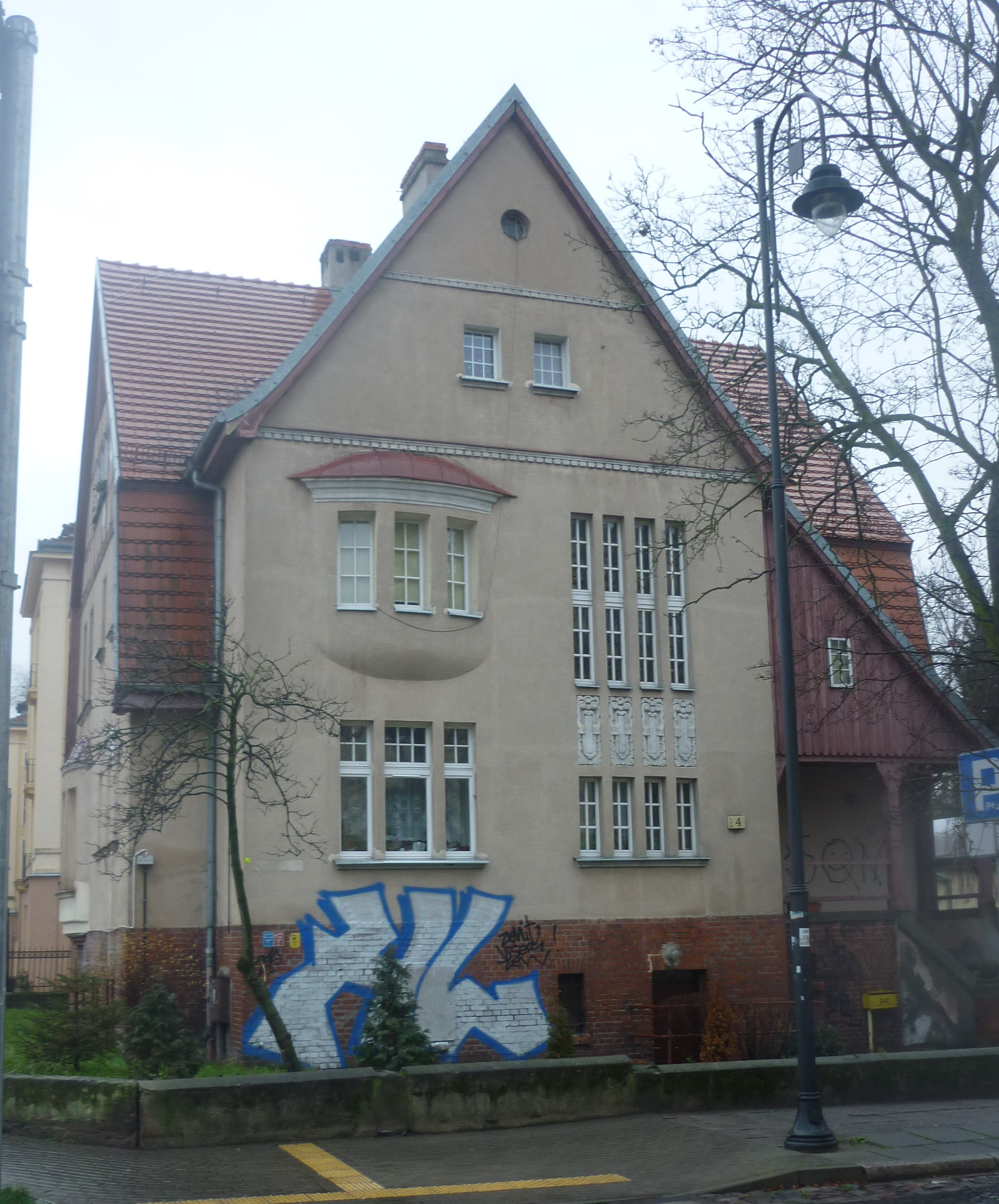
View of the villa from Niemcewicza street

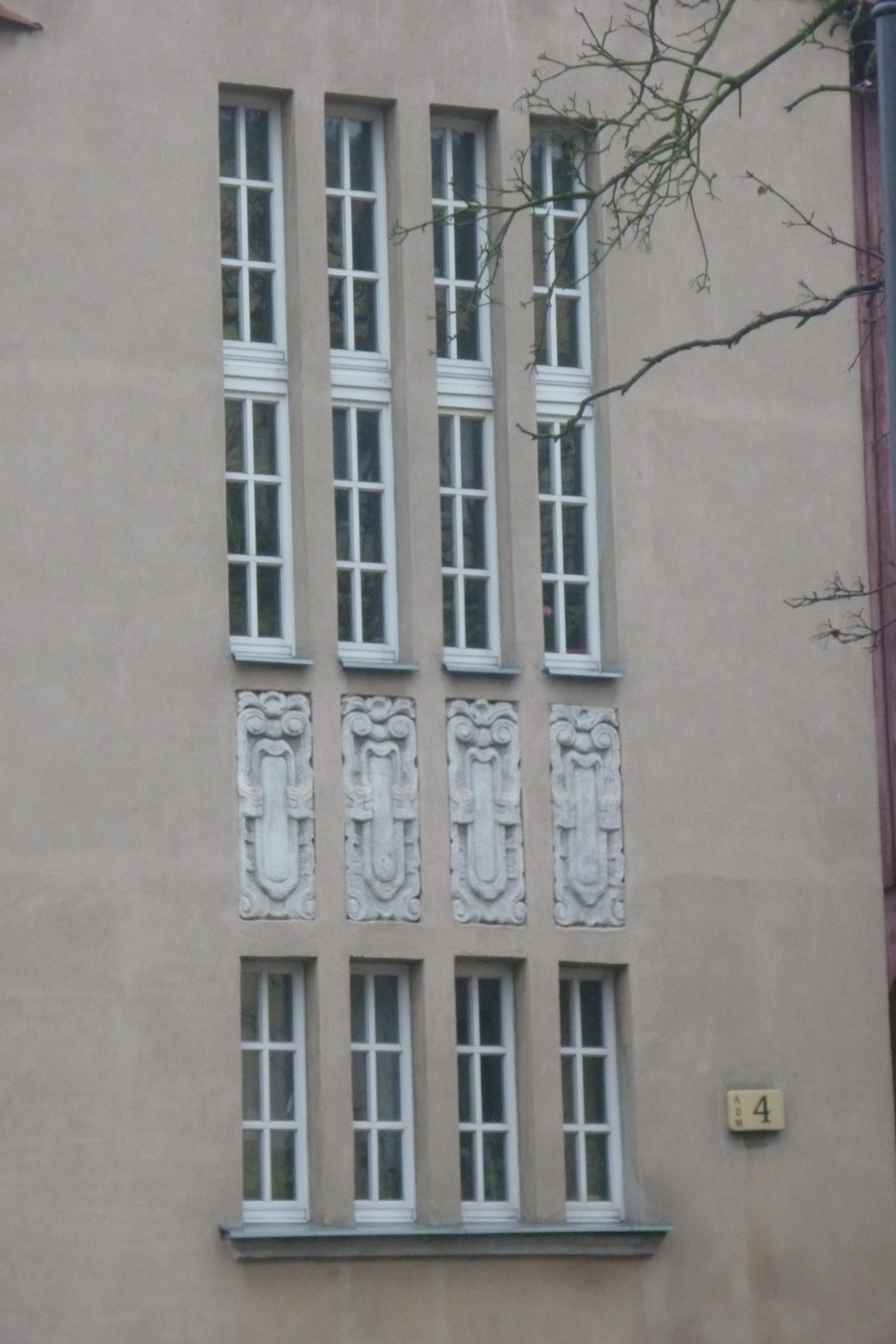
Detail of stuccoed motifs

=== Villas from the Villen Kolonie estate ===
The following houses are remnants on Chodkiewicza street of the Villen Kolonie estate scheme developed in the early 1900s, hence their unity in architectural fashion. Other instances of villas from this project are still visible in transverse avenues (Płocka, Kzięda Piotra Wawrzyniaka, Ksiẹcia Józefa Poniatowkiego). These edifices feature similar traits (so-called Landhaus Style), in particular the use of wattle and daub technique to recall traditional aspects.

==== Villa at 2 Płocka street, corner with Chodkiewicza ====
Registered on Kuyavian-Pomeranian Voivodeship heritage list, Nr.601389 A/1076 (August 12, 1994)

Beginning of the 20th century

This area of the street, originally part of the Bleichfelde commune, changed designation several times in the first years of the 20th century, following the development of properties: Hauptweg, Villen Kolonie, Schiller straße and finally Eisenhardt straße in 1905–1906. In this maze, the first landlord identified in 1905 for this villa is Oberleutnant Carl Kantner, director of the garrison.

This house is noticeable by its corner turret topped by a bell dome roof crowned with a finial.

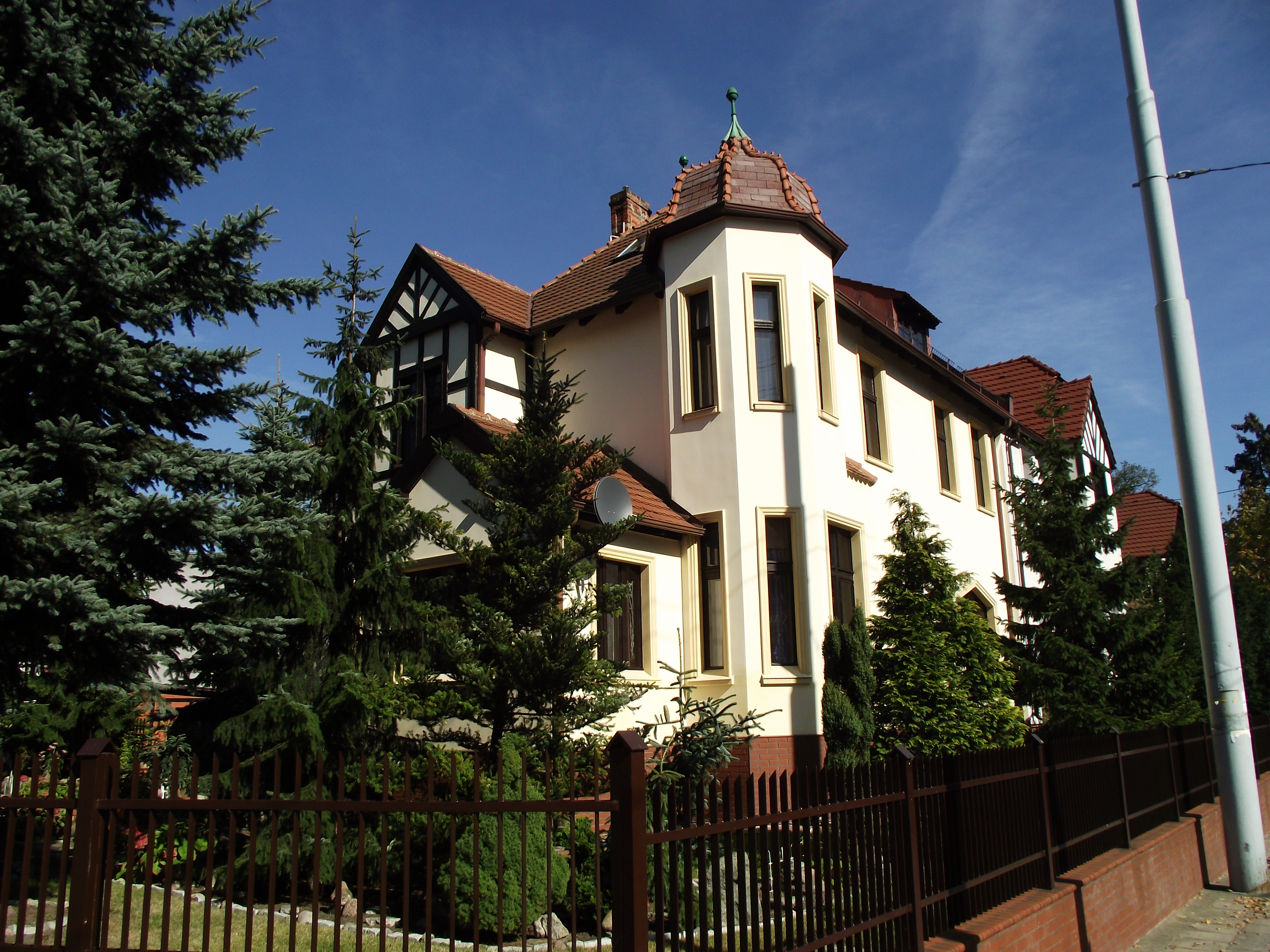
Current view from the street

==== Villa at 25 ====
Beginning of the 20th century

The house bore the address 2 Villen Kolonie when built. The first known owner in 1905, was Rudolf Herzog, an administrative clerk in a building firm.

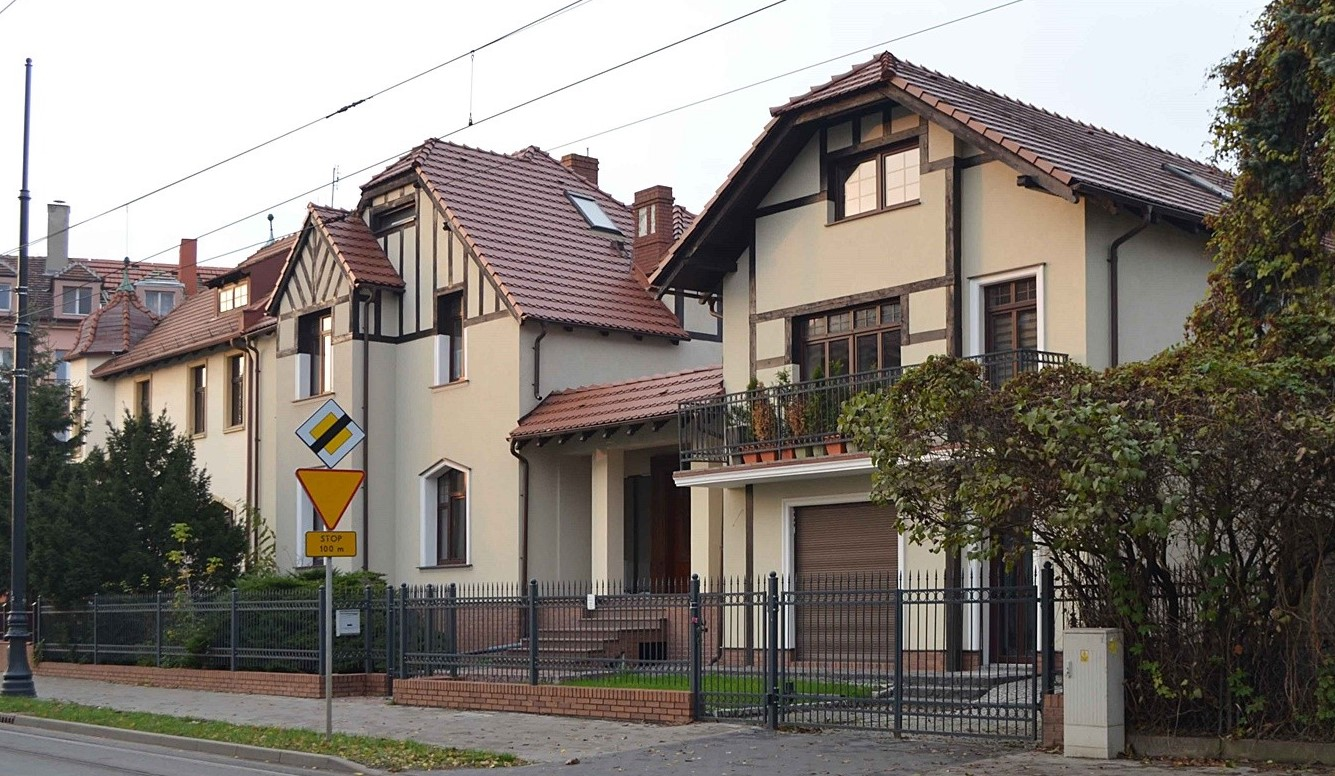
Current view from the street

==== Villa at 27 ====
Beginning of the 20th century

This house was listed as 3 Villen Kolonie in the Beamten – Wohnungsverein estate project. First landlord was Erich Grunwald, an administrative assistant.

This villa is remarkable by the presence of finials and a corner turret topped by an onion dome roof.

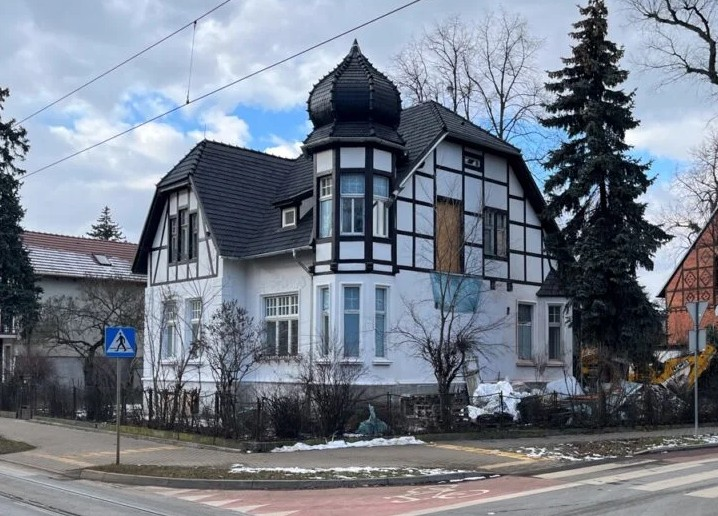
Current view from the street

==== Villa at 29 ====
End of the 19th century

Initial address was 4 Villen Kolonie, Bleichfelde commune. First landowner was Hugo ßieper, a city administrative assistant.

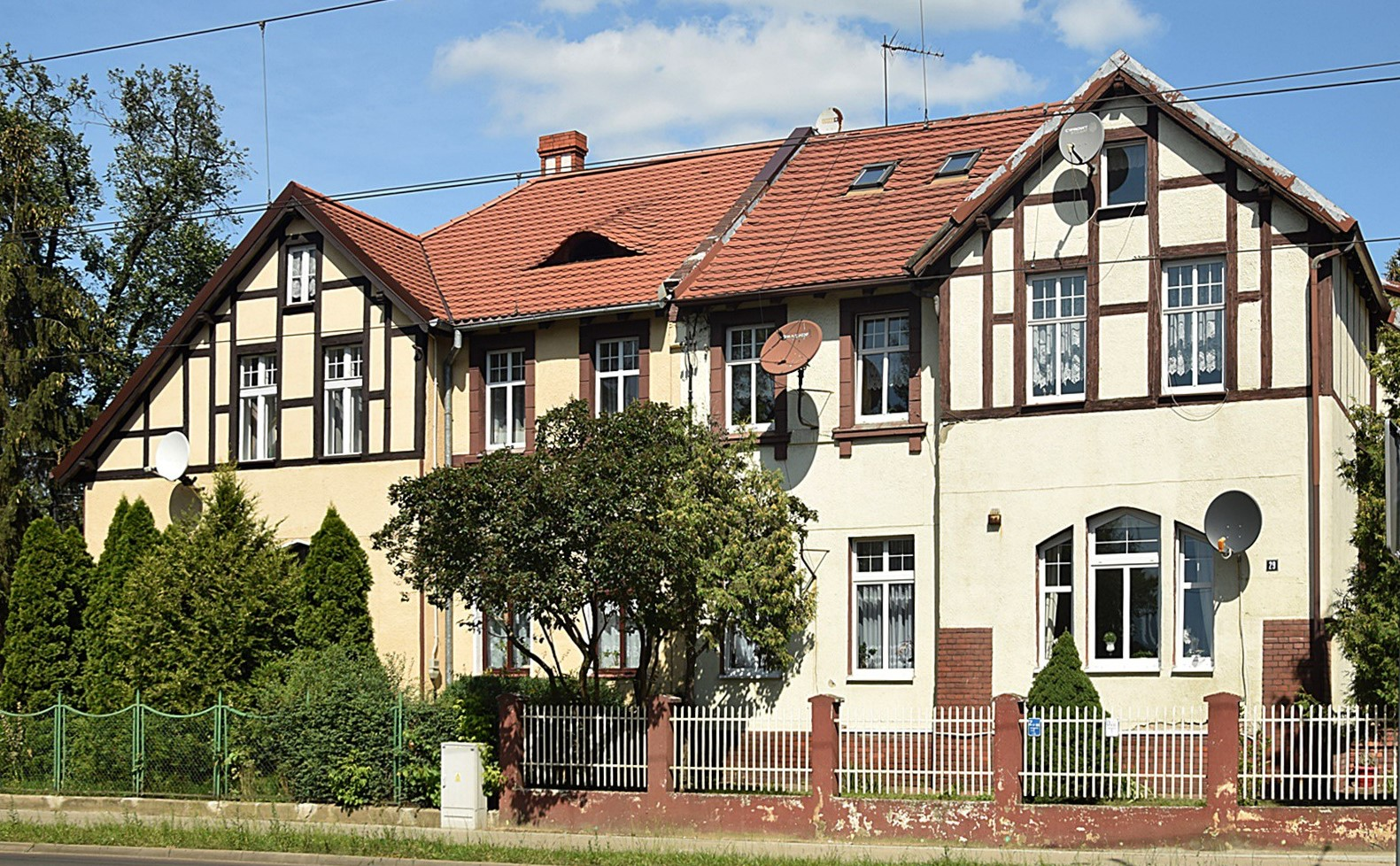
Current view from the street

=== UKW buildings at 30 ===
1934, by Albert Krüger

On October 17, 1934, the board of the Poznań School District issued a positive answer to the building of an ensemble of German schools in Bydgoszcz in the area delimited by the following streets: Chodkiewicza, Ogińskiego (today's Sportowa), Powstańców Wlkp and Niemcewicza.

The German organization Deutscher Schulverein had purchased the plot in 1928, but the municipal authorities were more than reserved on this project of an Albrecht Duerer Schule in Bydgoszcz, thus delaying the issue of the building permit. At the time, it was the largest German school in Poland and started its activity in September 1938, gathering all German educational institutions scattered around the city. It covered education classes from elementary school to gymnasium and comprised a large sport hall.

Since 1990, these buildings make up the back bone of the Kazimierz Wielki University. The ensemble on Chodkiewicza street is known as Collegium Maius (Main campus). The buildings harbours the following bodies:

- Rector's Office;
- Admissions Office;
- Teaching Department;
- Student Affairs Department;
- Main Library;
- Physical Education and Sport College;
- Vocational Training Centre;
- Foreign Language Centre;
- Faculties of Pedagogy and Psychology, Mathematics, Physics and Technology and Life Sciences.

In 2020, a roof renovation was completed, together with the reconstruction of the former library building.

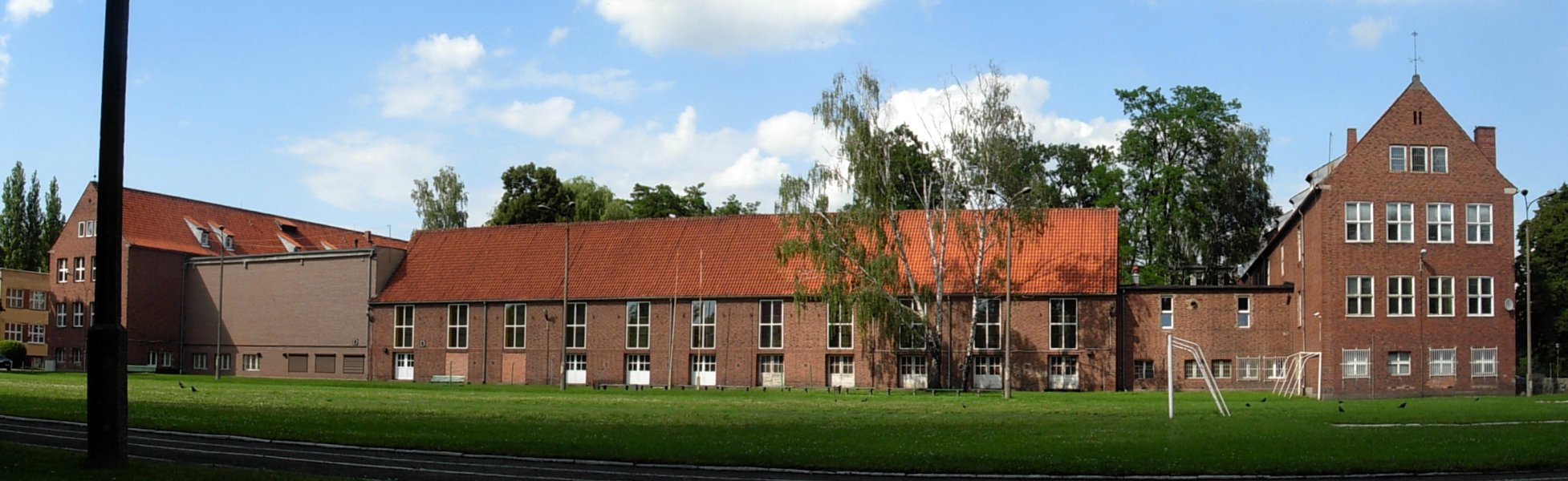
View from the street

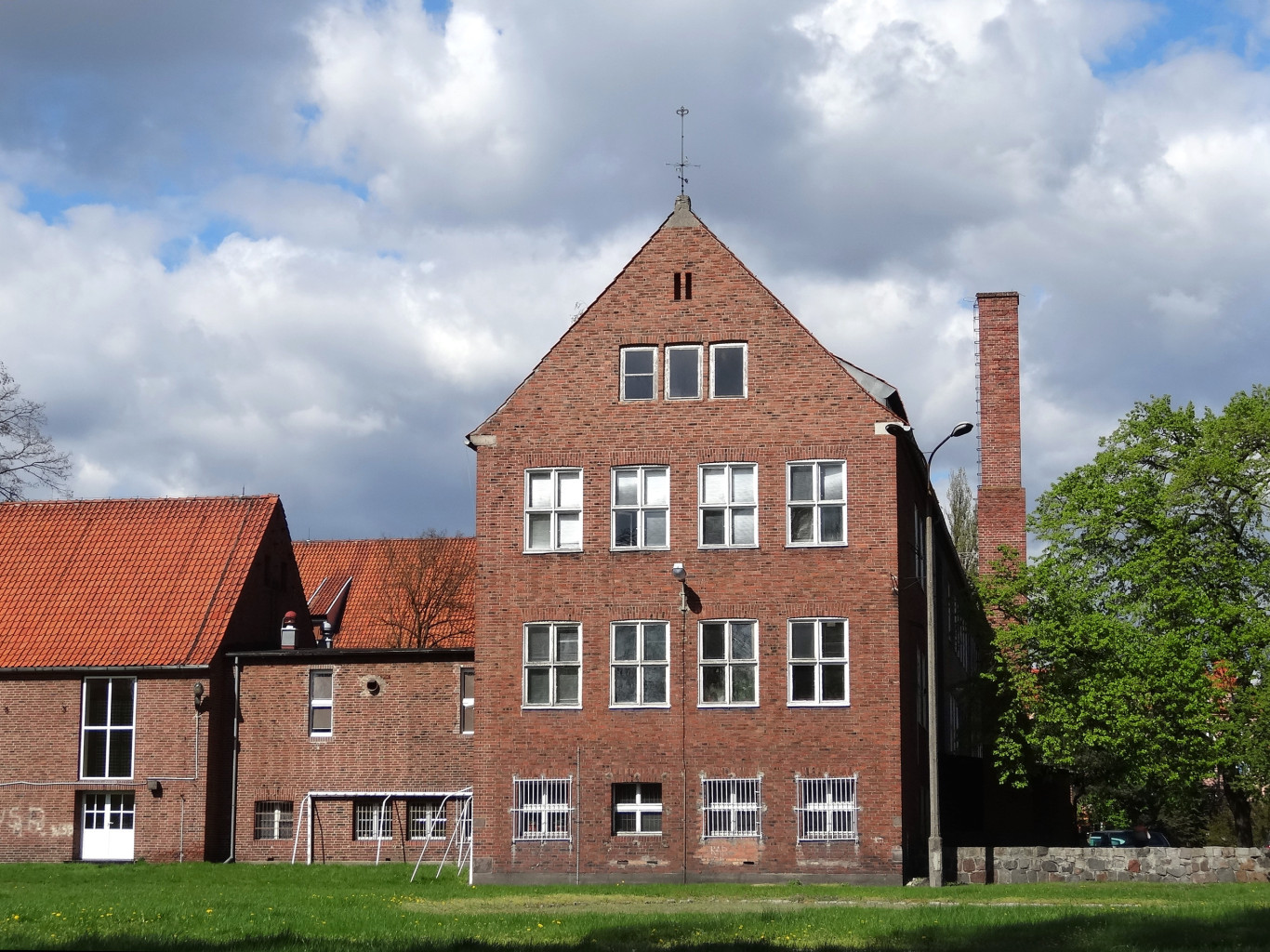
Detail of a building

=== Tenement at 31, corner with Ksiẹcia Józefa Poniatowkiego street ===
Beginning of the 20th century

Eclecticism

First sign of the building dates back to 1908, when Adolf Golß, a builder contractor, is listed as landlord. At the time, the tenement was registered as located on the secondary path, at 9 Yorkstraße (present day Poniatowkiego street) and housed on the ground floor a shop run by Bernardt Remler, a locksmith by trade.

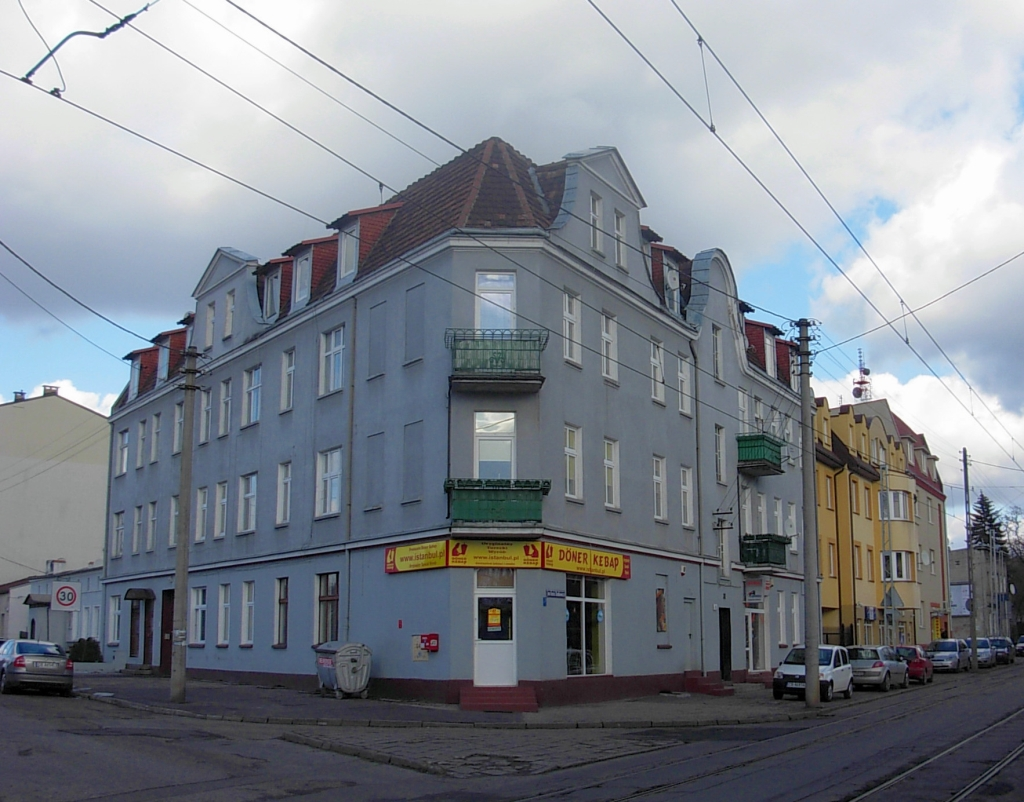
View from the street

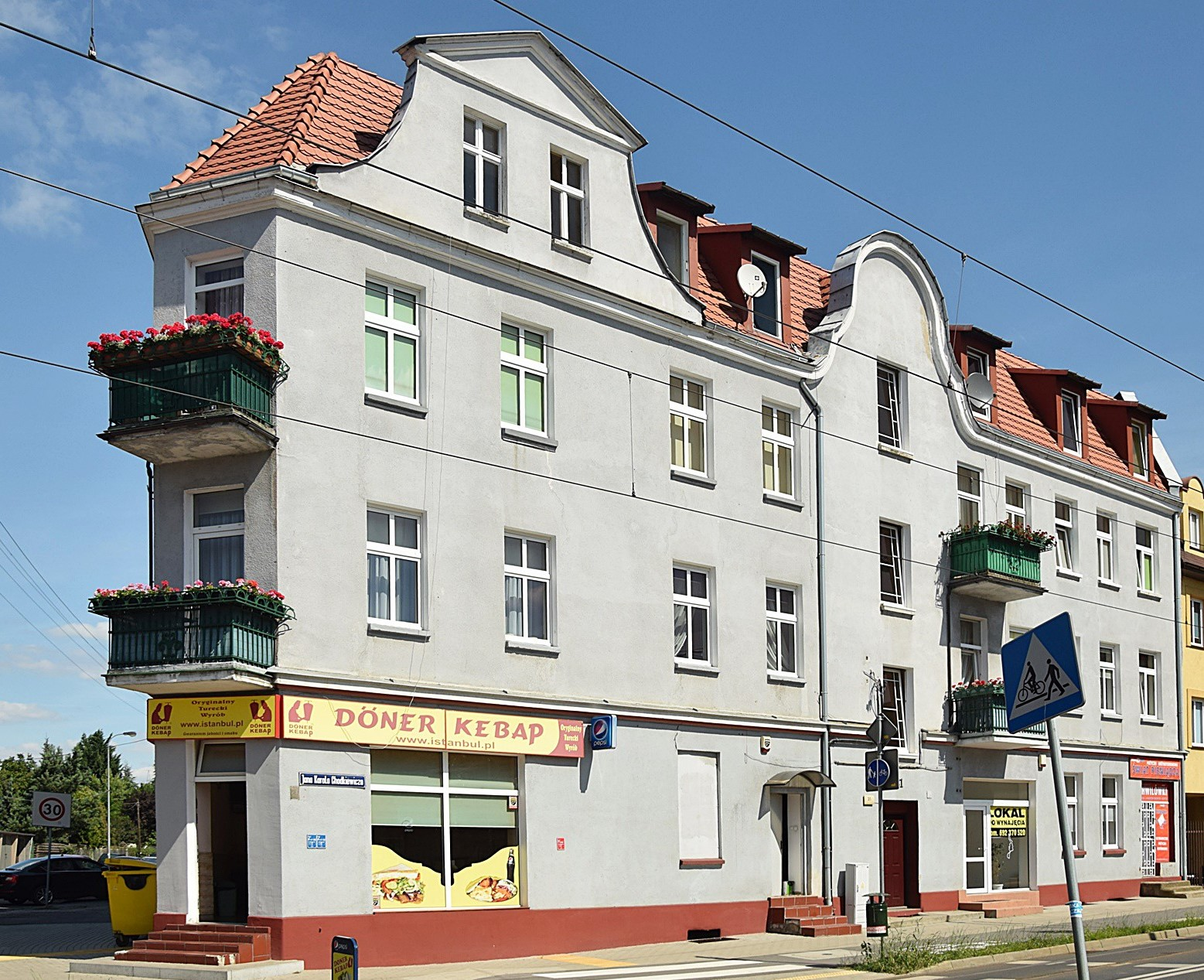
Elevation on Chodkiewicza

=== Building of the Prevention Police Department at 32 ===
Registered on Kuyavian-Pomeranian Voivodeship heritage list, Nr.601267, Reg.A/1055 (March 18, 1997)

1911, by Albert Schütze Studio

The building of the Prevention Police Department was initially an orphanage. In 2017, city authorities have decided to renovate entirely the edifice.

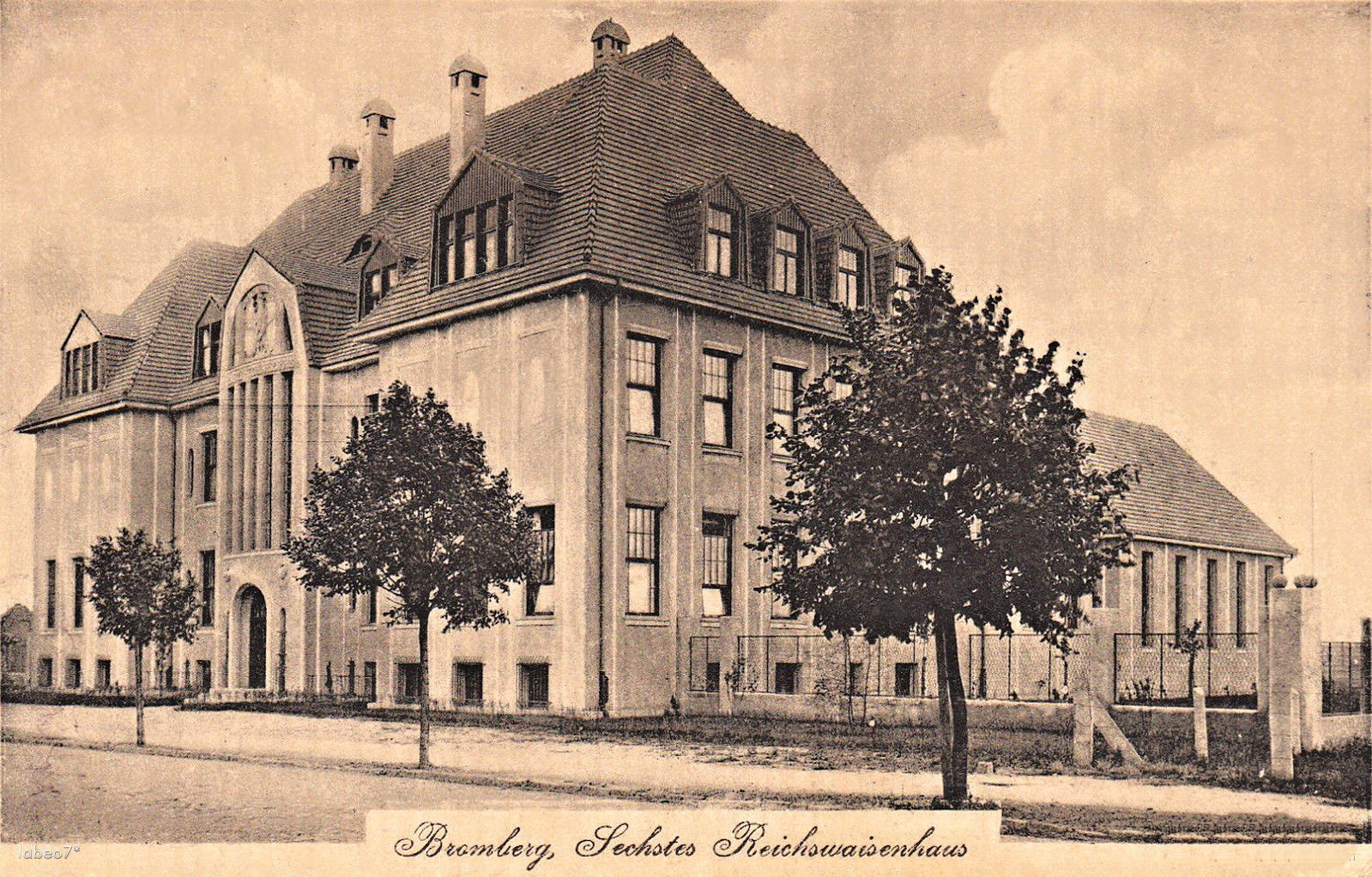
View of the building in 1916

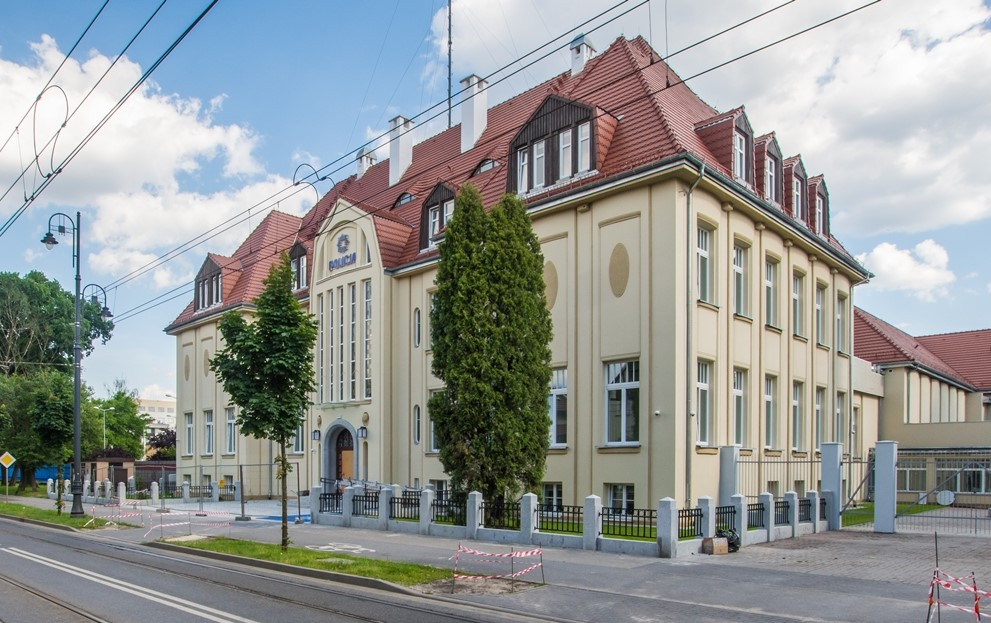
View from the street after renovation

=== Old municipal school buildings at 34, corner with Ksiẹcia Józefa Poniatowkiego street ===
1906

At this location was standing the municipal school (German: Kommunal Schule) of Bleichfelde. The brick houses at Nr.34 were elements of this ensemble. Most of the ancient plot is now owned by the UKW (Institute of political sciences). The building at Nr.34 houses today a municipal police station.

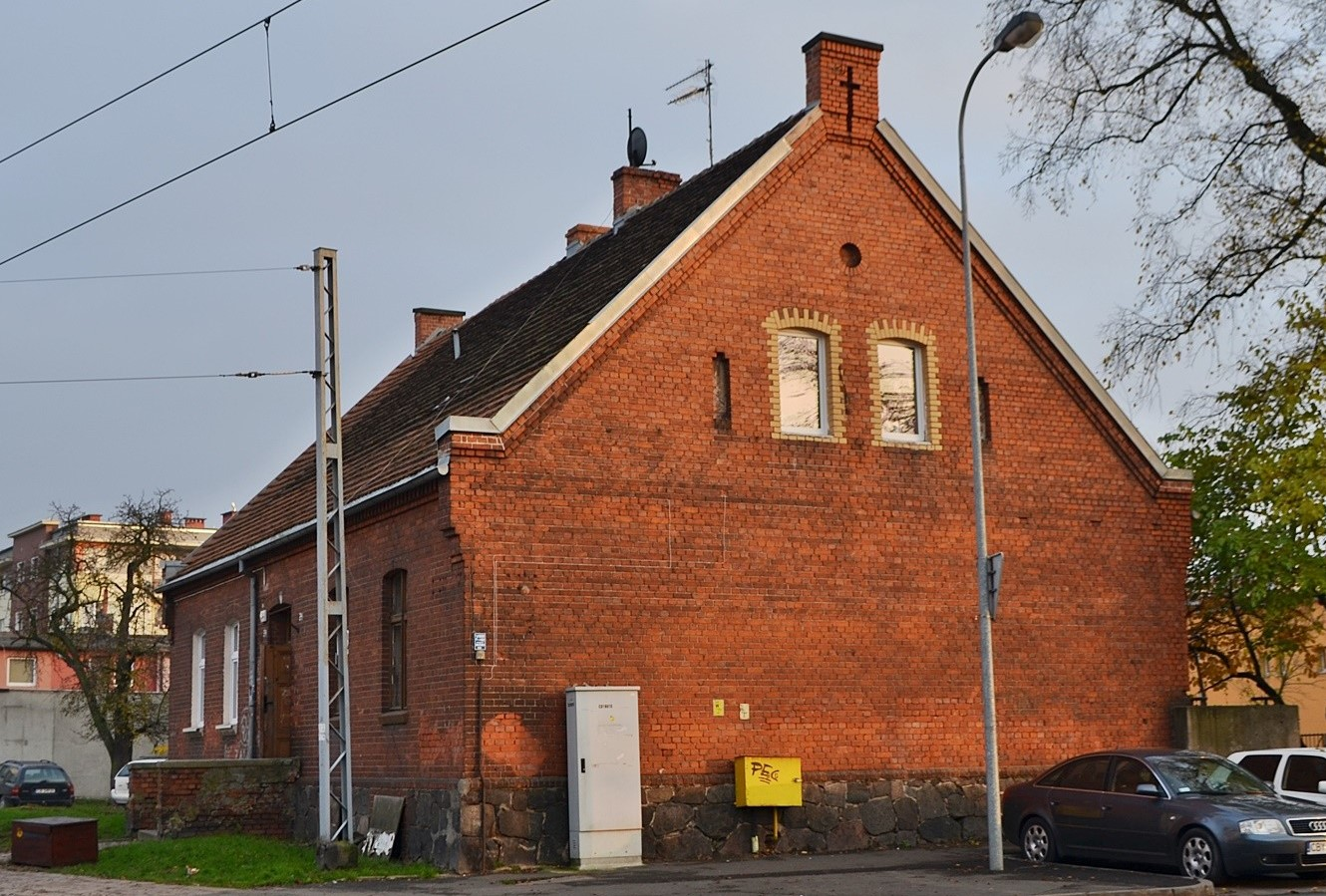
View of one of the houses from the street

=== Józef Brudziński Regional hospital for children, at 42/44 ===
1930s

The Kreis Bromberg, ancestor of today's Bydgoszcz County set up in 1880, the first hospital buildings on the terrain of then Bleichfelde commune. Known as the County Hospital and Asylum for the terminally Ills and later more simply as District hospital (German: kreiskrankenhaus), it was run by Evangelical deaconess sisters.

The buildings were erected within a 2 hectares (4.9 acres) park. After a few years of operation, departments of surgery and internal medicine were created and two new buildings erected (1890). In 1905, the shelter for old people's was closed, while the clinic reached a 60-bed capacity. During WWI, the institution treated wounded German soldiers.

In the interwar period, the hospital mainly handled patients from outside Bydgoszcz and an adjoined chapel was built. In 1930, the hospital had 120 beds assigned to four departments (surgery, internal medicine, infectious diseases and eye care). Three years later a thorough modernization was performed: the expansion project was designed by Jan Kossowski and unveiled on December 30, 1933. In 1938, the district sold the hospital to the city of Bydgoszcz: it was then subordinated to the newly University Hospital Nr. 1 – Antoni Jurasz.

German occupation had the facility devoted to child care, as a municipal hospital with infection, ENT, ophthalmology and orthopedics departments. After the liberation, this function as a children's hospital remained.

In 1953, the institution was renamed Provincial Children's Hospital – Józef Brudziński. It offered residential, specialised and outpatient care for children and young people from Bydgoszcz and its province. In 1964, a new laboratory building and lodgings for nurses were built. In 1980, the extension of the University Hospital Nr.1 made the chair of Children's Diseases of Bydgoszcz Medical Academy to be moved to the children's hospital, where it still seats.

In 1999, the 10-departments facility passed under the jurisdiction of the Kuyavian-Pomeranian Voivodeship. In 2011–2014, the hospital was significantly rebuilt, which included tearing down existing buildings and erecting new ones from scratch.

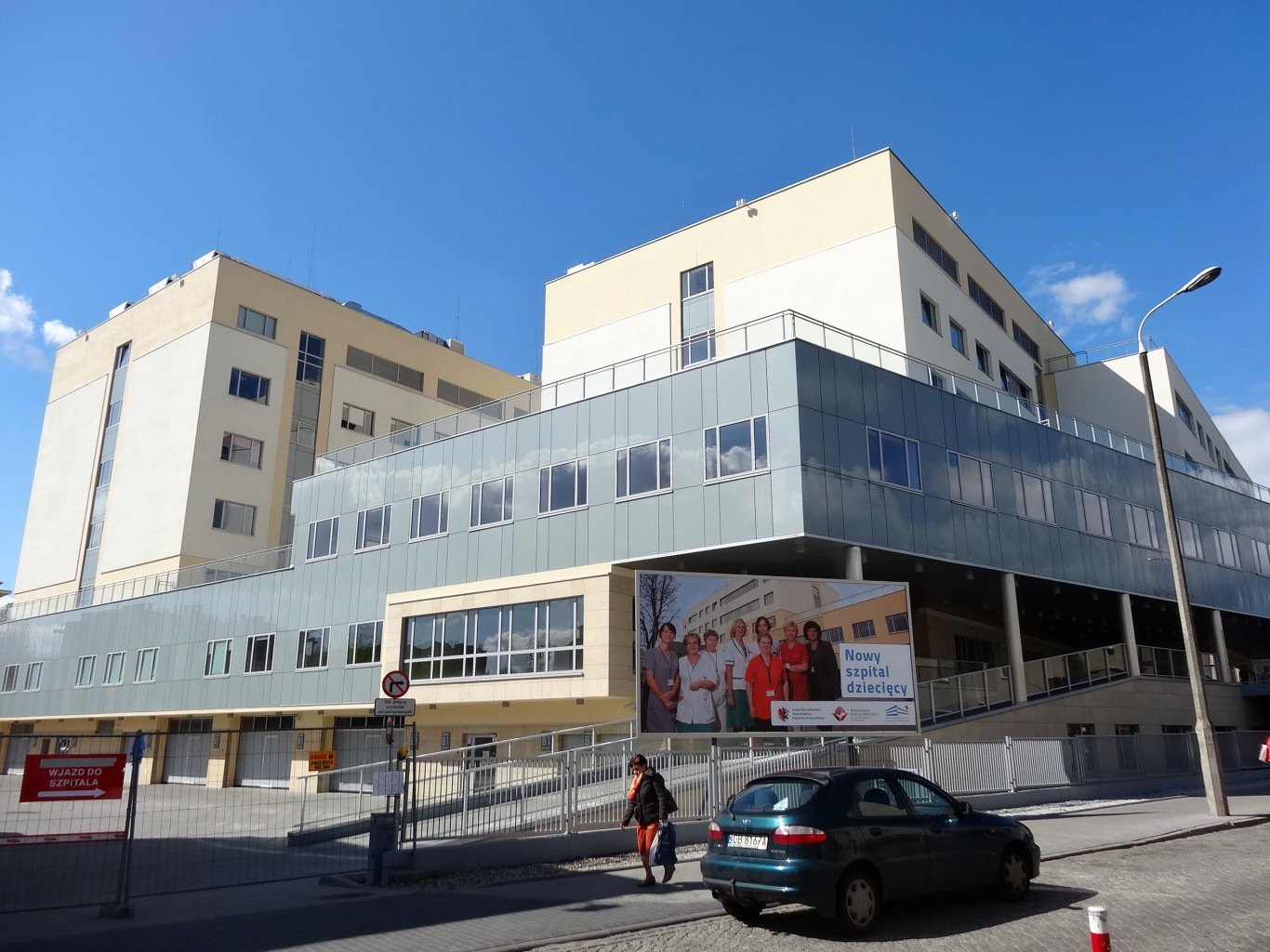
Current modernized facility

=== Villa at 51 ===
1925

Built in the mid-1920s on the location of an existing house, the villa at then 39 ul. Senatorska offered renting accommodation under the name Villa Emilie. In the 1990s, the UKW took over the edifice and set up there the Department of Environmental Protection of the Faculty of Life Sciences. Very damaged, the university had to sell the building to private investors in 2014. A project of renovation of Nr.51 and erection of an abutting ensemble at Nr.53 is to be delivered in 2020.

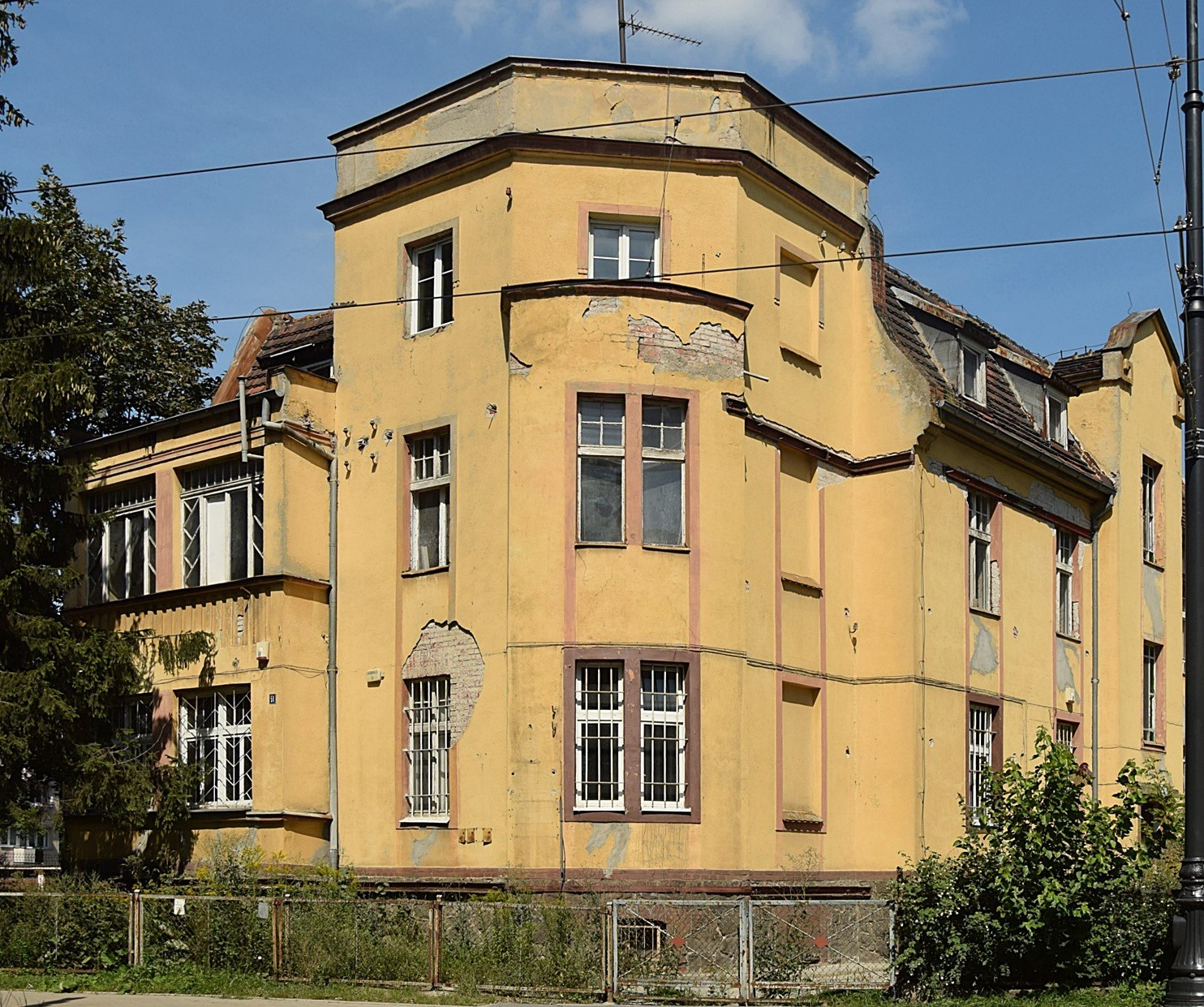
View from the street before rebuilding

=== Villa at 65, corner with Lelewela street ===
1934

The house was designed by Józef Trojański.

The building has a notable layout, with a foot print in the shape of a triangle, with a rounded south-west corner. The use of various materials mingling at different heights enhance chiaroscuro effects inside the villa.

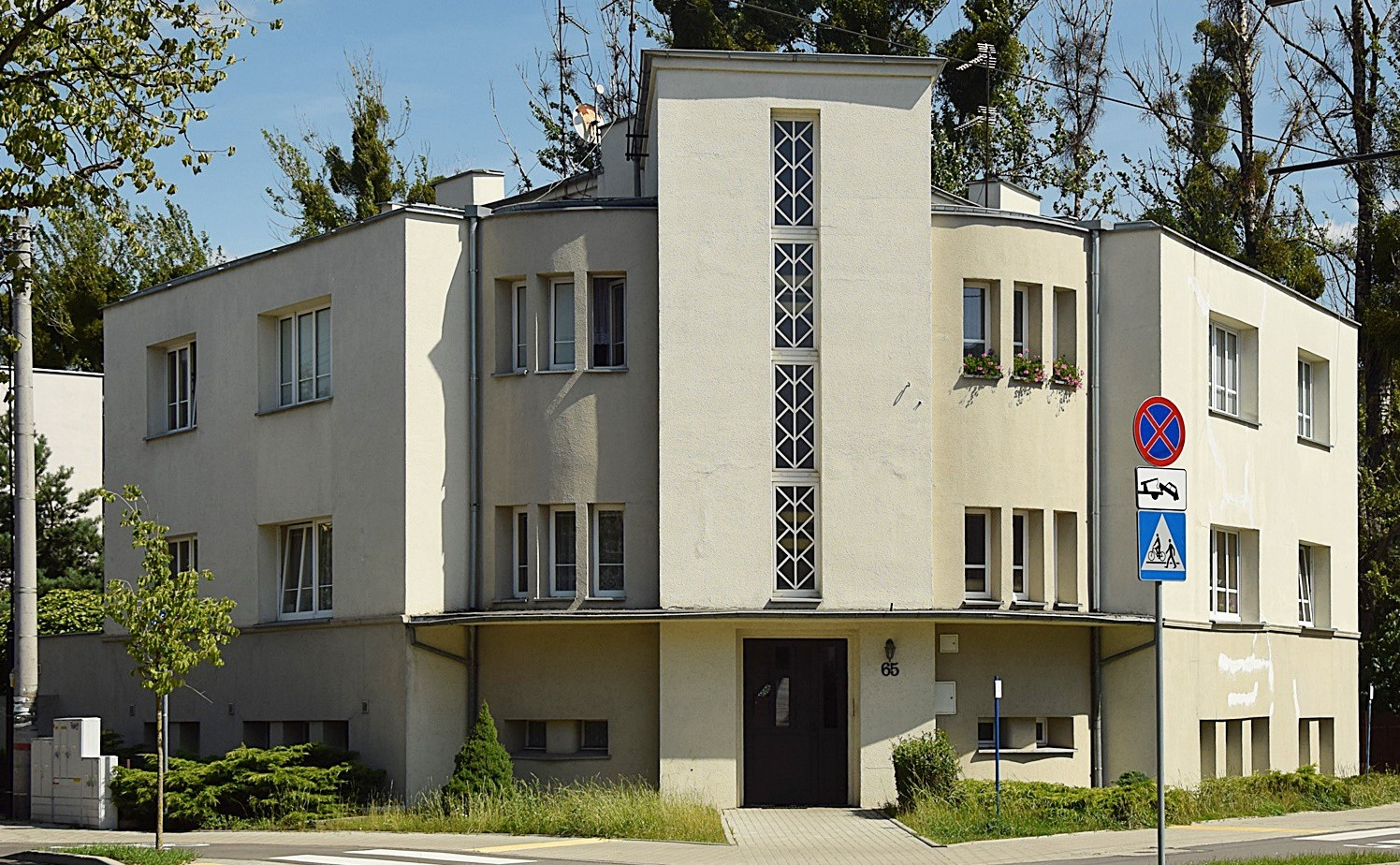
View from the street crossing

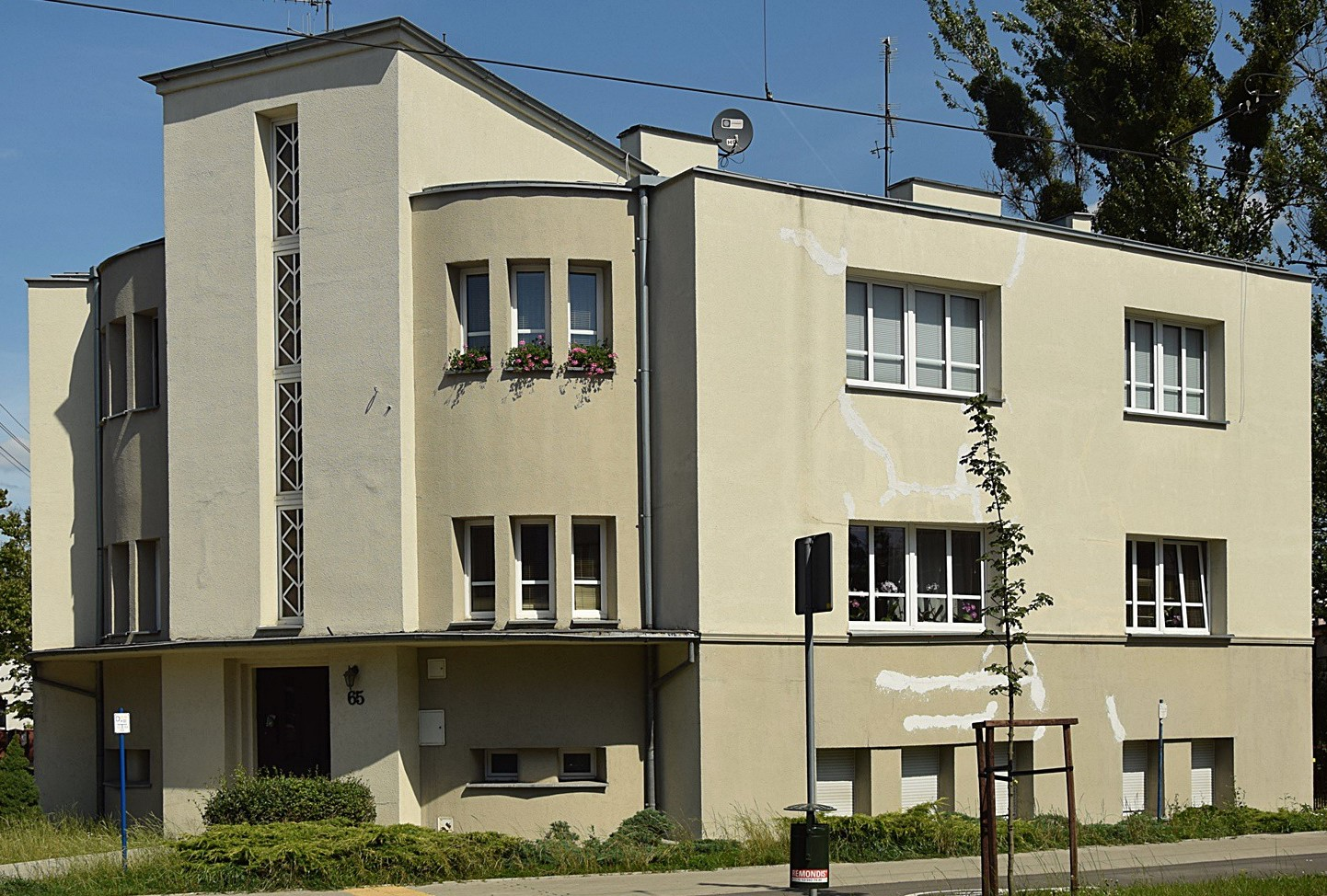
Facade on Chodkiewicza

=== Tenement at 67 ===
Beginning of the 20th century

Art Nouveau

The tenement was owned by Josef Becker, an entrepreneur who launched a Dairy city cafe (German: milchkurenstadt) called Hohenzollern, at this location, then 30 Kufürstenstraße. The concept was to sell on the spot dairy produced directly from the cows, in a cafe-like environment, similar to what was fashionable in the beer gardens. Josef Becker ran also another dairy cafe at 13 Danzigerstraße (today's 19 Gdańska Street). The cafe was operative till the first World War with another owner from 1907, Albert Schmidt.

Although bruised, the tenement still displays Art Nouveau features:

- around the street door (mascarons on top of pilasters, with an ellipsoid transom light);
- Stuccoed mascarons crowning the round-shaped pediment.

On the side, one can still recognize the terrace which is present on some ancient pictures, from the time of the dairy cafe.

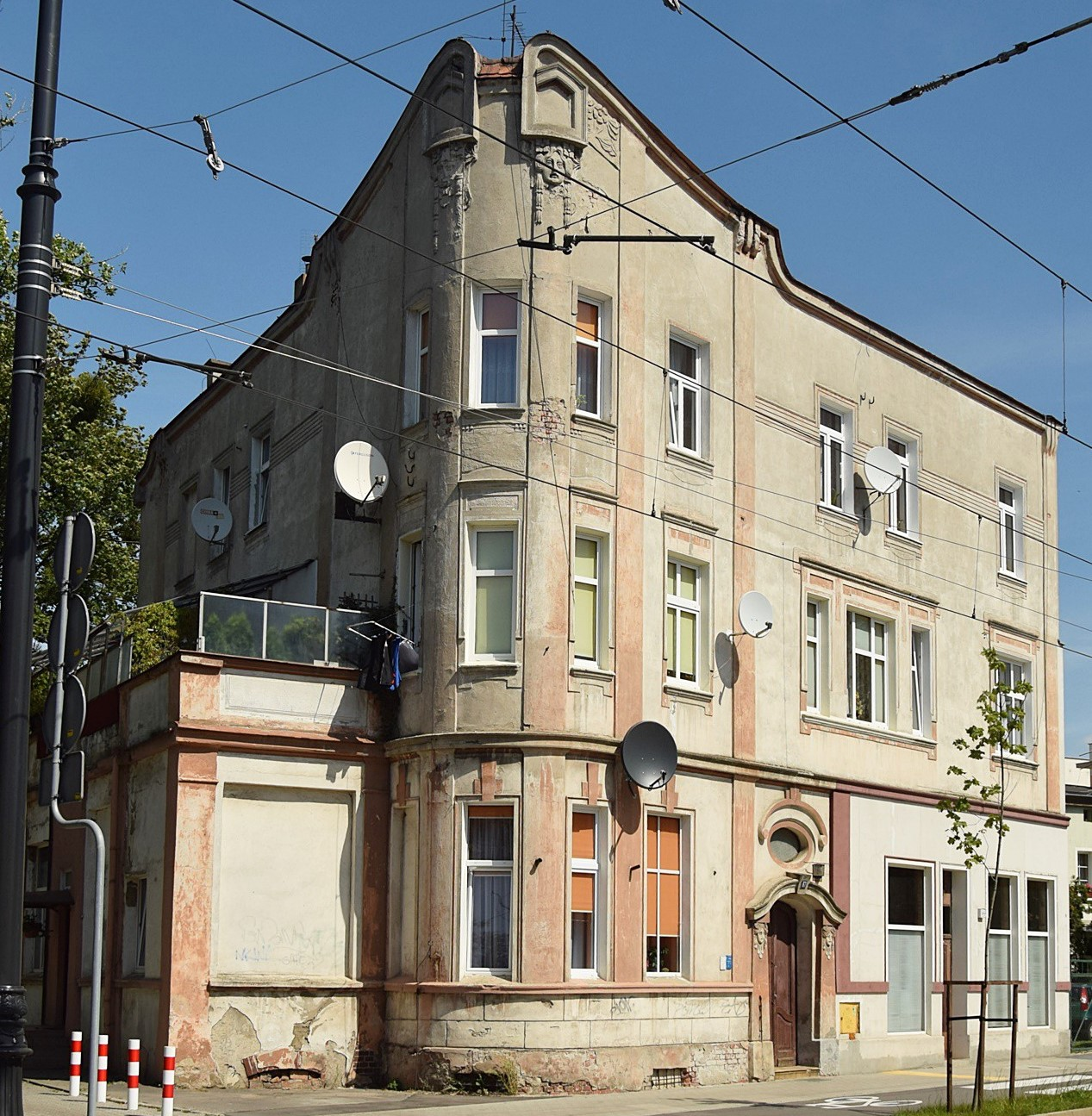
View from the street crossing

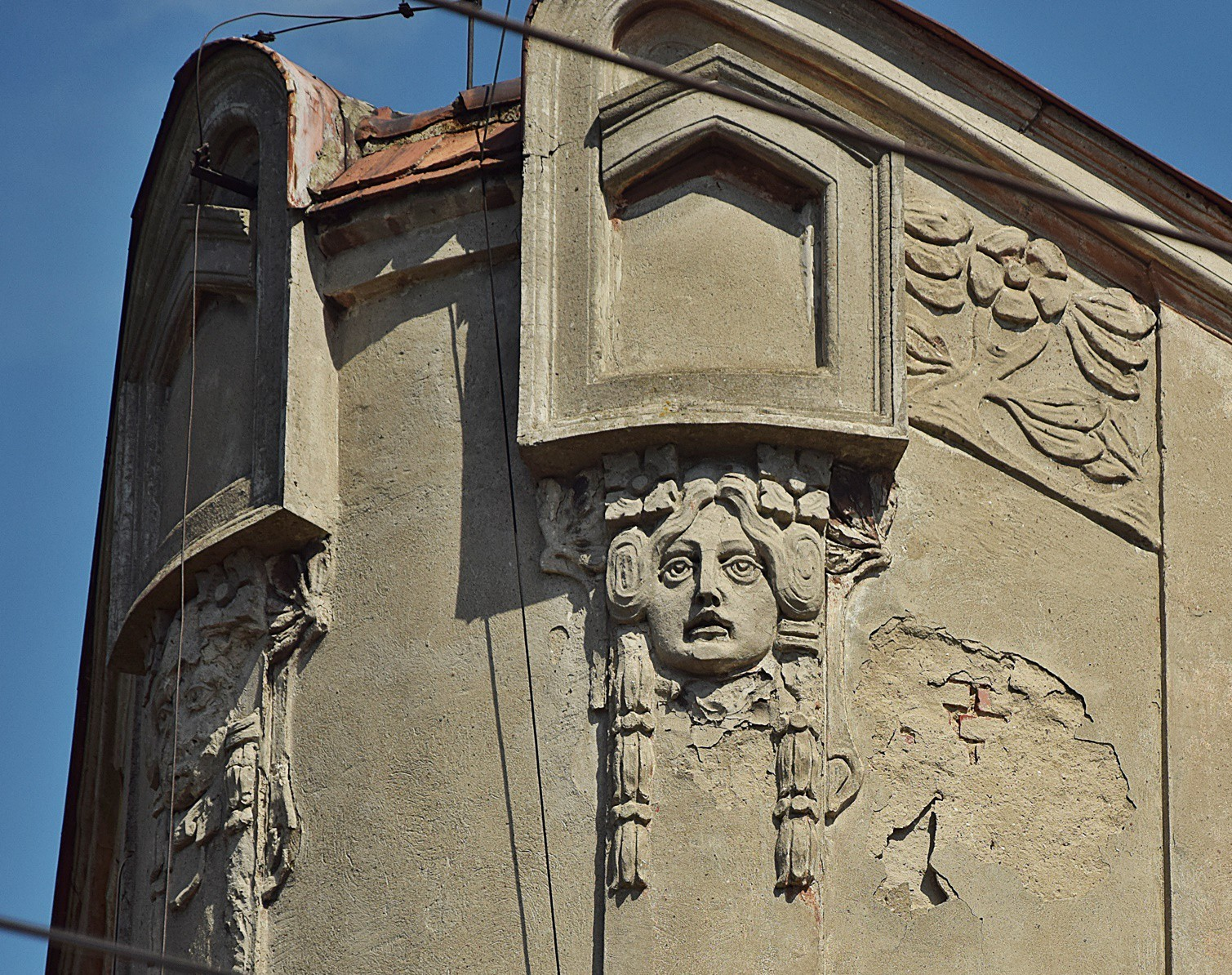
Detail of the top pediment

== See also ==
- Bydgoszcz
- Jan Karol Chodkiewicz
- Kazimierz Wielki University in Bydgoszcz
- Józef Brudziński

== Bibliography ==
- (in German) Pszczółkowski, Michał (2014). Kleines Berlin. Grundzüge der Stadtentwicklung von Bromberg 1850–1914. academia.edu.
- (in Polish) Jastrzębska-Puzowska, Iwona (2003). Od miasteczka do metropolii. Bydgoszcz: Mado. ISBN 83-89886-71-5.
