= Bronisław Kentzer =

Entrepreneur, Bydgoszcz, Poland, 19th–20th century

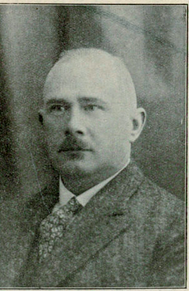
- Bronisław Kentzer
- Born: 10 January 1880; Prust, German Empire
- Died: 16 November 1939 (aged 59); Bydgoszcz, Reichsgau Danzig-West Prussia
- Occupations: Merchant, entrepreneur
- Known for: Kentzer Mills, Bydgoszcz

Bronisław Kentzer (1880 — 1939) was a Polish entrepreneur, an economic activist and Greater Poland uprising insurgent. Kentzer pioneered large scale commerce and trading in Bydgoszcz.

== Biography ==
Bronisław Kentzer was born on 10 January 1880 in Prust, today's Pruszcz, Kuyavian-Pomeranian Voivodeship. He was the son of Michał, a farmer, and Apolonia née Meliński.

After graduating from middle schools in Pelplin and Chełmno, he turned his interest to trading business, starting to work in several large department stores of then Bromberg, such as the "Brandt" Department store at present day 2 Theatre Square, which opened in the early 1900s.

He launched his own business in Bydgoszcz/Bromberg in 1906: a warehouse of colonial goods at "71 DanzigerStrasse" (137 Gdańska street).

During World War I, he was drafted into the German Army and fought on the Eastern front. After the end of the conflict and the outbreak of the German Revolution, Kentzer returned to Bydgoszcz in November 1918. There, he participated in the Greater Poland uprising till mid-1919.

In 1918, he had purchased a large tenement from Max Rosenthal, running a shipping company, at 42 Gdańska Street. There, Bronisław set up a warehouse for his firm, the Colonial Goods Wholesale and Coffee Roaster B. Kentzer i Ska (Polish: Hurtownia Towarów Kolonianych i Palarnia Kawy B. Kentzer i Ska). The latter quickly became one of the largest trading companies in Pomerania and Greater Poland. After the conflicts, Bronisław moved to an apartment at 7 20 January 1920 Street.

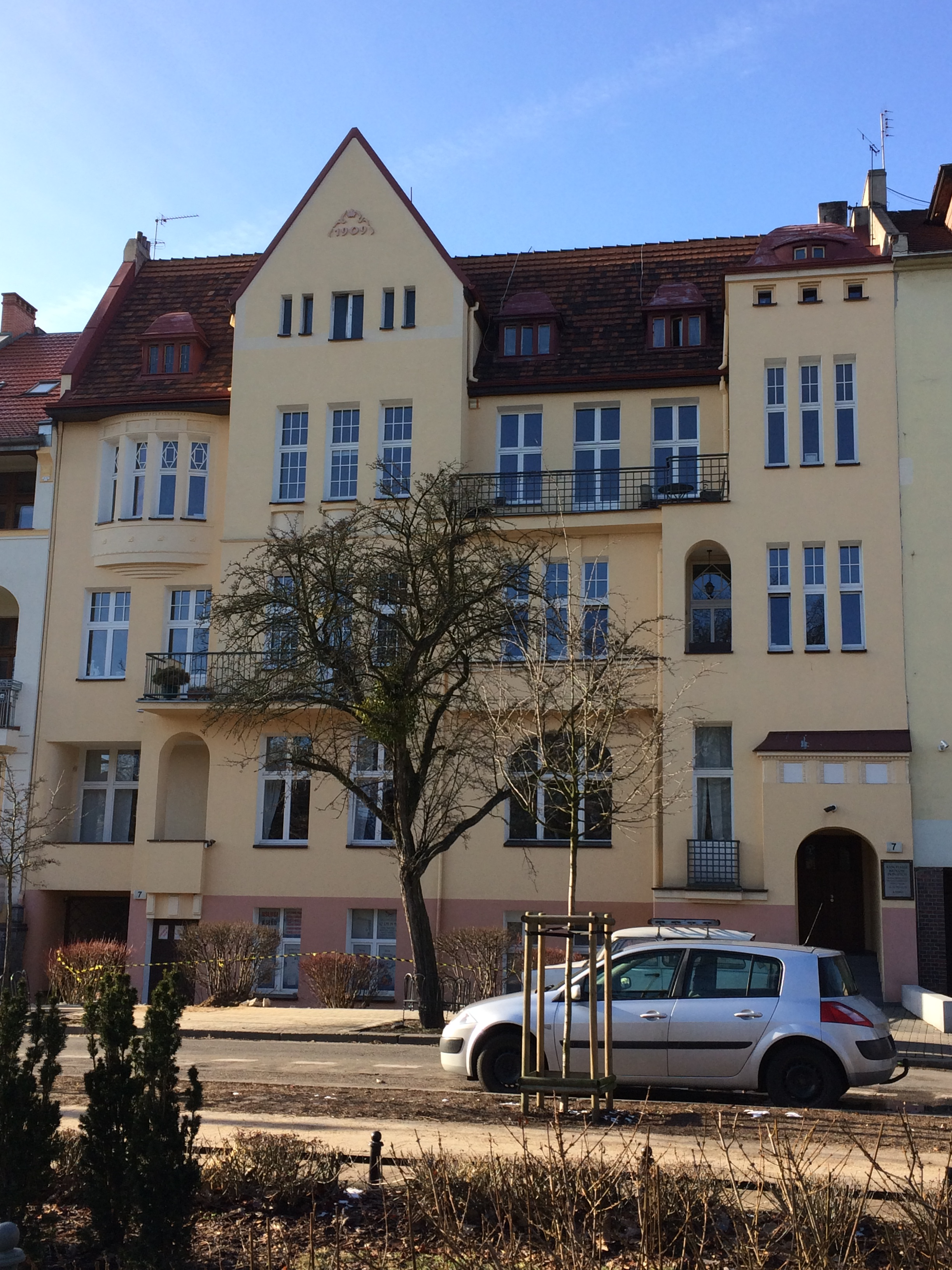
Tenement at 7 20 Stycznia 1920 street

This firm, with solid financial foundations, was relied upon by most of the businessmen. From 1927 onwards, Bronisław and his brothers Jan and Tadeusz were members of the "Bydgoski Dom Towarowy" (Bydgoszcz Department Store), one of the largest companies in Western Poland. Bronisław owned shares in other companies, such as "Hübner i Ska", a beetroot syrup factory in Smolno near Toruń.

In addition to his economic activity, Kentzer had a strong social activity. Under the Prussian period, he operated vigorously in the "Bydgoszcz Merchant Society" (Polish: Bydgoskie Towarzystwo Kupieckie), which he had co-founded in 1909. Together with his brother-in-law Antoni Weynerowski, Bronisław donated to construct an extension to the hospital at today 10/18 Świętego Floriana Street, run by the Daughters of Charity of Saint Vincent de Paul.

He was active as well:

- in the "Merchants' Youth Society";
- in the "Bydgoszcz Rowing Society" (Polish: Bydgoskie Towarzystwo Wioślarskie (BTW)).

His actions greatly contributed to strengthening Polish trade in Bydgoszcz and Poznań regions, thanks also to the connections acquired via the newly created (December 1935) Rotary Club of Bydgoszcz.

At the rebirth of the Polish State, Bronisław Kentzer became a counselor of the Bydgoszcz Chamber of Industry and Commerce. Furthermore, he took the following positions:

- vice-president of the Chamber of Commerce and Industry in Gdynia;
- counselor of Bydgoszcz Grain Stock Exchange;
- president of the supervisory board of the "Bank Bydgoski" which operated from 1921 to 1929.

Determined to develop trade in Gdynia, he actively participated in the establishment of "Hakol", a Polish colonial goods trade company, which was selling its products throughout Poland.

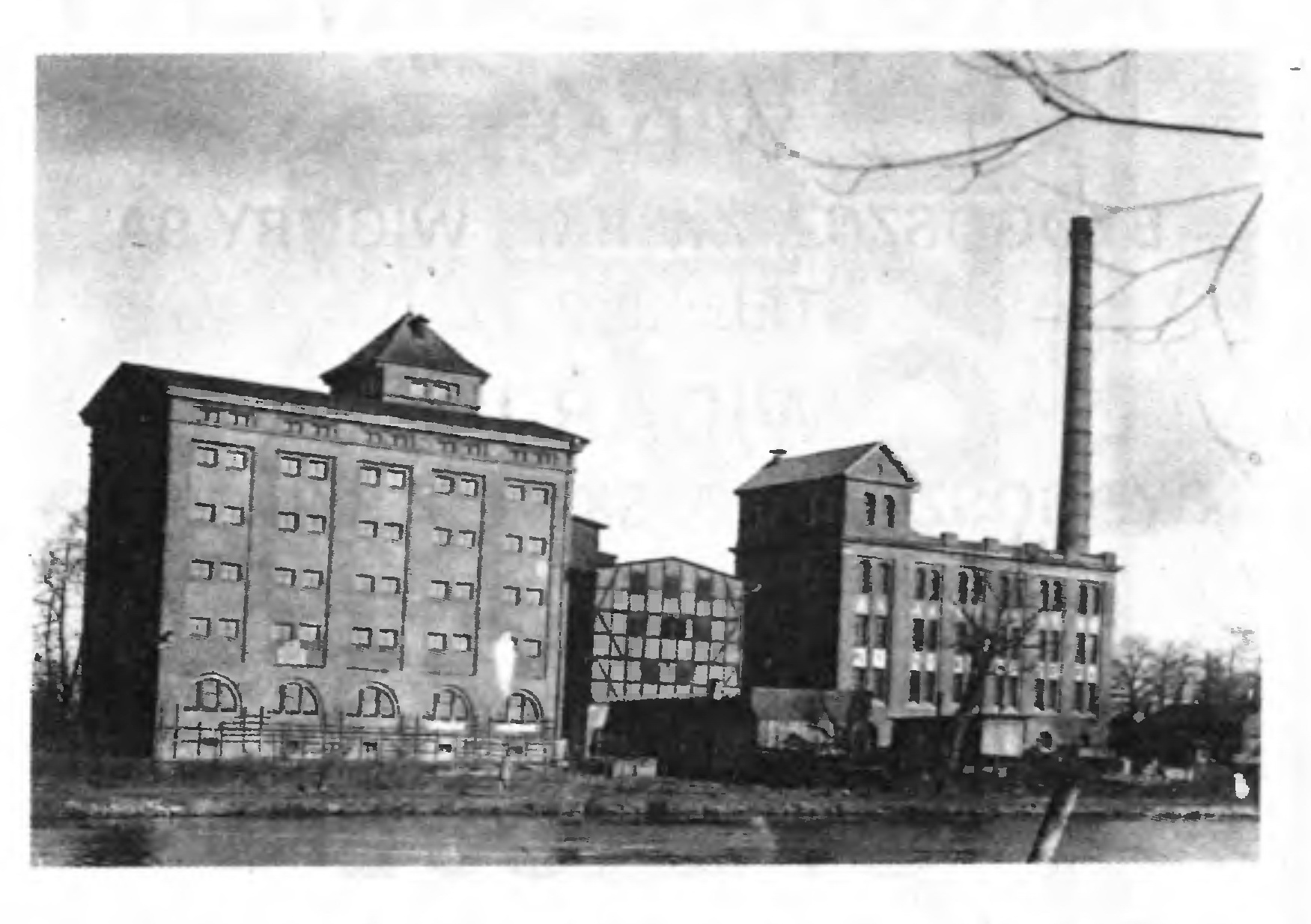
Mills on the Brda river, ca 1870

During the German occupation of Bydgoszcz, Bronisław Kentzer was arrested. He was executed on 16 November 1939, as part of the Intelligenzaktion mass murders, probably on the site of the Valley of Death in Fordon.

== Kentzer's Mill - Hotel "Słoneczny Młyn" ==
The first records of the mill date back to 1862, though its existence is assumed older. It was erected by Ludwik Wolfen and Meyer Fliess, as a small steam mill with a negligible economic importance. Its main interest was its convenient location by the river, enabling waterways transport of grain and flour.

In 1892, the facility was taken over by L. Berwald and in 1899, it was operated by the company of Willie and Moritz Baerwald. At that time, the firm carried out a thorough modernization of the production site (new steam engines and a dedicated narrow-gauge railway connecting to the Brda river), making it one of the most modern mill in the city, competing with the mills established on Mill Island.

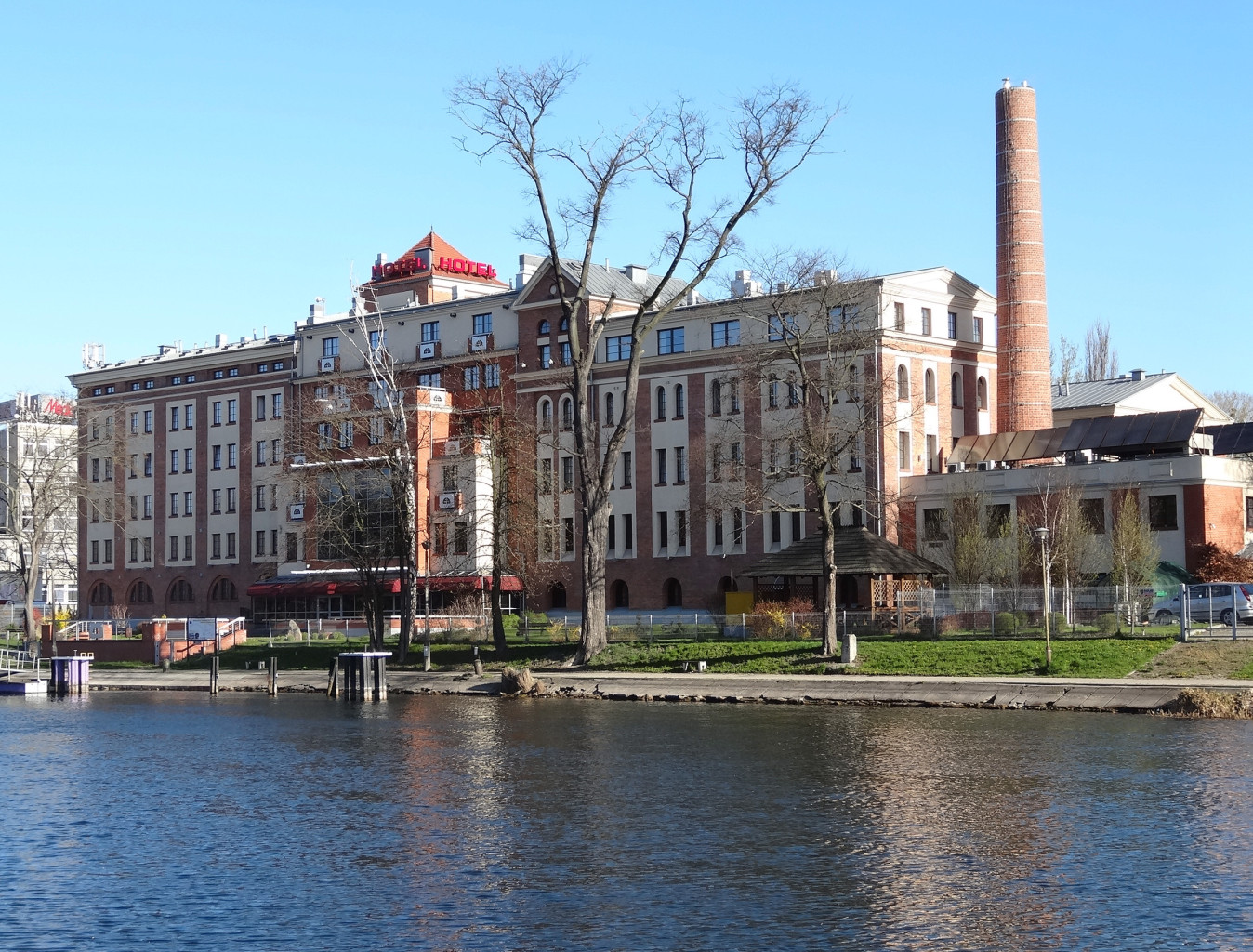
Restored mills – Hotel "Słoneczny Młyn", 2015

Baerwald's mill capacity reached 30 tons of flour per day at the turn of the 20th century and employed about 25 people. In 1916, an extension added a five-storey tower used as a warehouse.

Bronisław Kentzer, who gave his name to the building, purchased the mills in 1938. Under his direction, the new firm Młyny Kentzera reached a daily flour production of about 50 tons.

In 1940, the building was taken over by German authorities. After WWII, the facility initially owned by the Społem Cooperative was then run by Jan Kentzer. After 1948, the plant was nationalized and taken over by the "State Grain Works in Bydgoszcz" (Polish: Państwowe Zakłady Zbożowe w Bydgoszczy), mainly for flour production. In the 1970s, it had a daily processing capacity of approximately 100 tons of grain. After being transformed into a joint-stock company in the late 1990s, the firm filed for bankruptcy in 2003 and the mill complex was left for sale.

In 2006, the building was bought by the company "Bakoma"", which converted it into a stylish, four-star hotel under the name Słoneczny Młyn (Sunny Mill).

== Family ==
Notable siblings:

- Jan took over the "Młyny Kentzera" after WWII until the nationalization;
- Leokadia (1876 in Kamienica – 1927 in Berlin) married Antoni Weynerowski (1864–1939), a Polish entrepreneur, founder in Bydgoszcz of the firm Leo, renamed Kobra, one of the largest shoe factory in the interwar Poland.

Niece:

- Gabriela Kentzer, from the family of the owners of the pre-war "Kentzer Mills", worked from 1950 to 1969 as a teacher in "Szkoła Podstawowa 29" (Primary School 29), located at 26 Słoneczna street.

== See also ==
- Bydgoszcz
- Gdynia
- Mill Island, Bydgoszcz
- Antoni Weynerowski
