= Albert Rostenkowski =

State legislator in Illinois

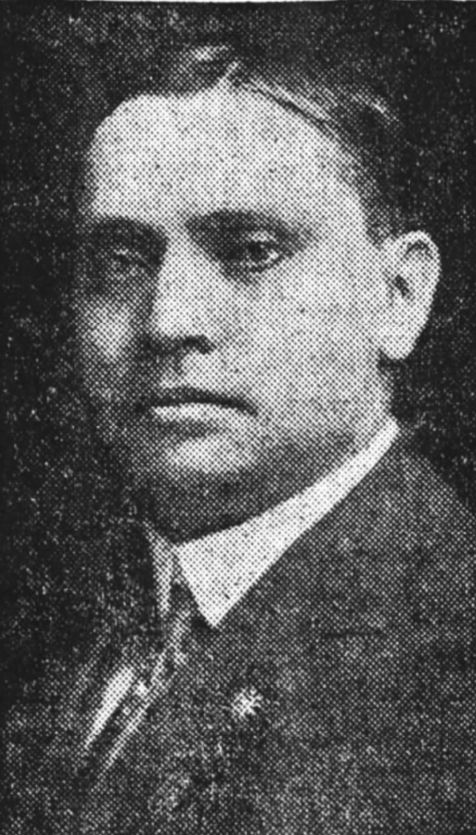
Albert Rostenkowski (circa 1916)

Albert Rostenkowski (1875–1929) was a state legislator in Illinois. He served several terms in the Illinois House of Representatives.

He was born April 23, 1875 in Gostycyn, Poland, and moved to the United States in 1892.

He worked as a deputy tax collector and deputy tax assessor. He was elected to the Illinois House in 1912. A Republican, he was in the Illinois House from 1913 to 1916 and from 1923 to 1926. Joe Rostenkowski was his nephew.

He died in 1929 and was remembered by the house.
