= Żółwiniec, Kuyavian-Pomeranian Voivodeship =

Żółwiniec
- Village
- Location within Poland
- Coordinates: 53°33′08″N 17°50′41″E
- Country: Poland
- Voivodeship: Kuyavian-Pomeranian
- County: Tuchola
- Gmina: Gostycyn
- Postal code: 89-500

Żółwiniec [ʐuu̯ˈviɲɛt͡s] is a village in the administrative district of Gmina Gostycyn, within Tuchola County, Kuyavian-Pomeranian Voivodeship, in north-central Poland.

Six Polish citizens were murdered by Nazi Germany in the village during World War II.
