= Gostycyn =

- Village
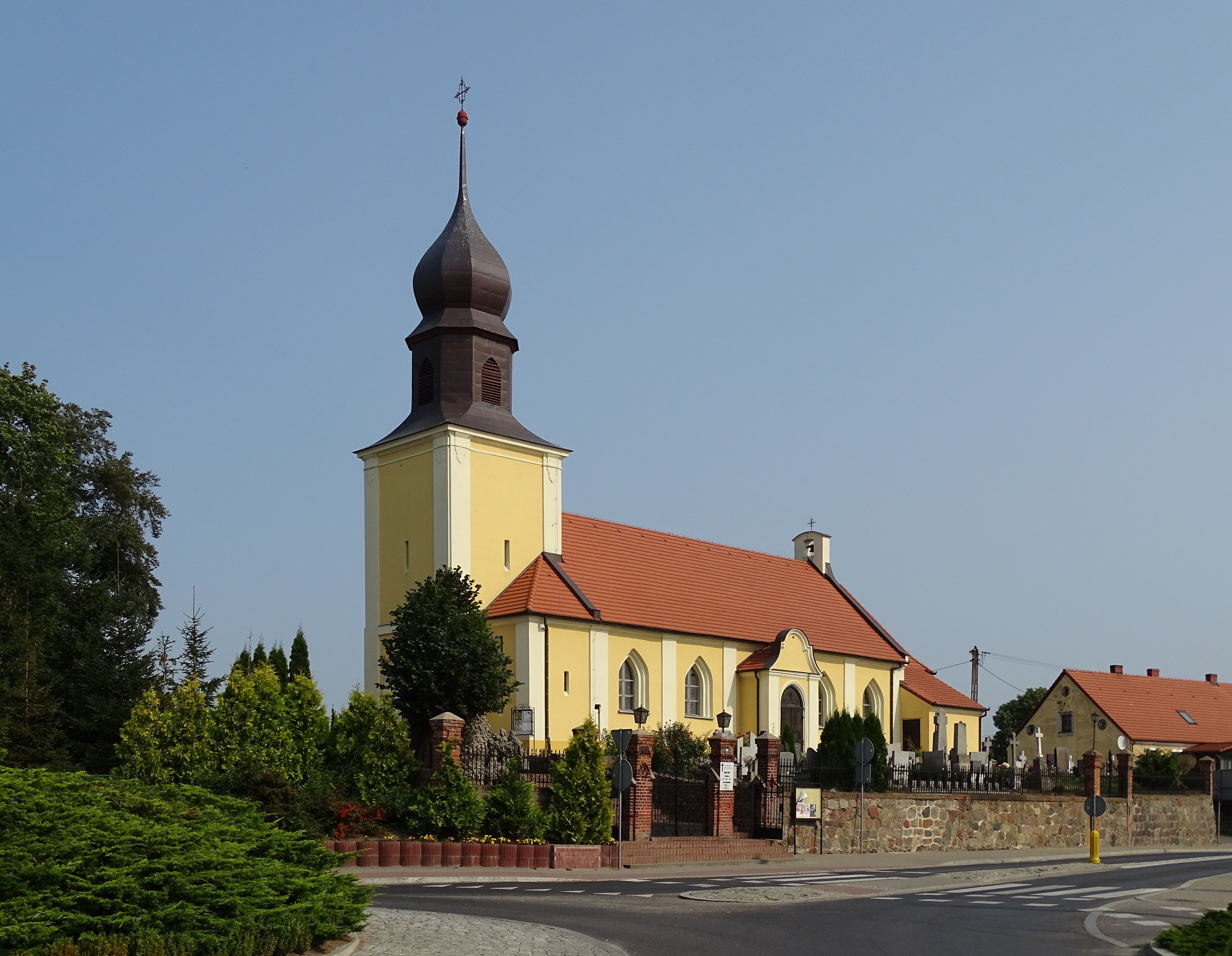
- Saint Martin church in Gostycyn

- Coat of arms

- Location within Poland
- Coordinates: 53°29′21″N 17°48′36″E
- Country: Poland
- Voivodeship: Kuyavian-Pomeranian
- County: Tuchola
- Gmina: Gostycyn
- Population: 1,800
- Time zone: UTC+1 (CET)
  - Summer (DST): UTC+2 (CEST)
- Vehicle registration: CTU

Gostycyn [ɡɔsˈtɨt͡sɨn] is a village in Tuchola County, Kuyavian-Pomeranian Voivodeship, in north-central Poland. It is the seat of the gmina (administrative district) called Gmina Gostycyn. It is located within the historic region of Pomerania.

== History ==
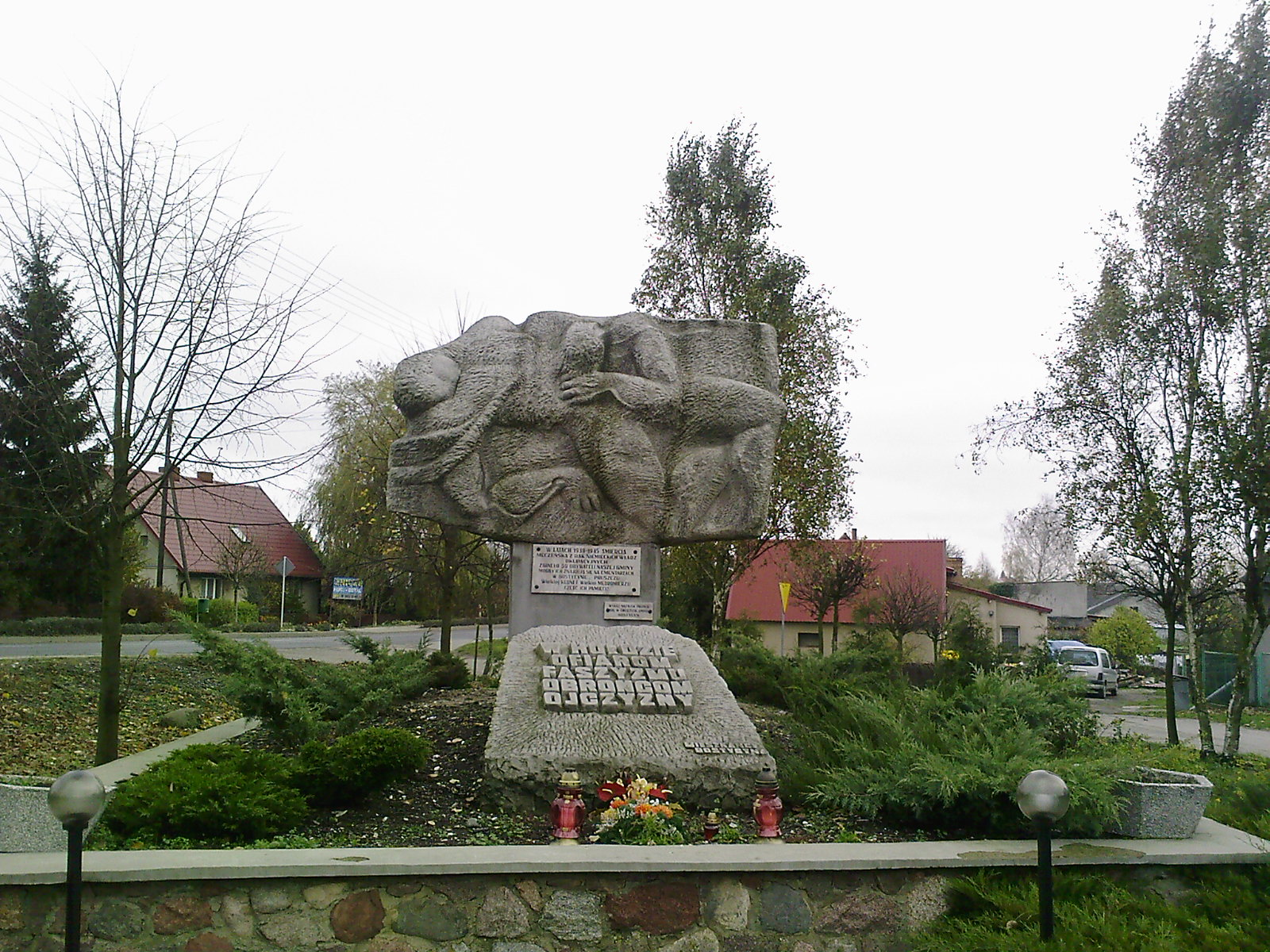
Memorial to the local victims of the Nazi German occupation

Gostycyn was a royal village of the Polish Crown, administratively located in the Tuchola County in the Pomeranian Voivodeship.

During the German occupation of Poland (World War II), the Germans arrested several Polish inhabitants and also murdered local Polish teachers in the large massacre of Poles in Rudzki Most as part of the Intelligenzaktion. In 1942–1943 many Poles were expelled, while their farms were handed over to German colonists as part of the Lebensraum policy.

== Notable people ==
- Albert Rostenkowski (1875–1929), born in Gostycyn, member of the Illinois House of Representatives
