= Świętego Floriana Street =

Street in Bydgoszcz, Poland

Coordinates: 53°07′21″N 18°00′33″E

Bydgoszcz
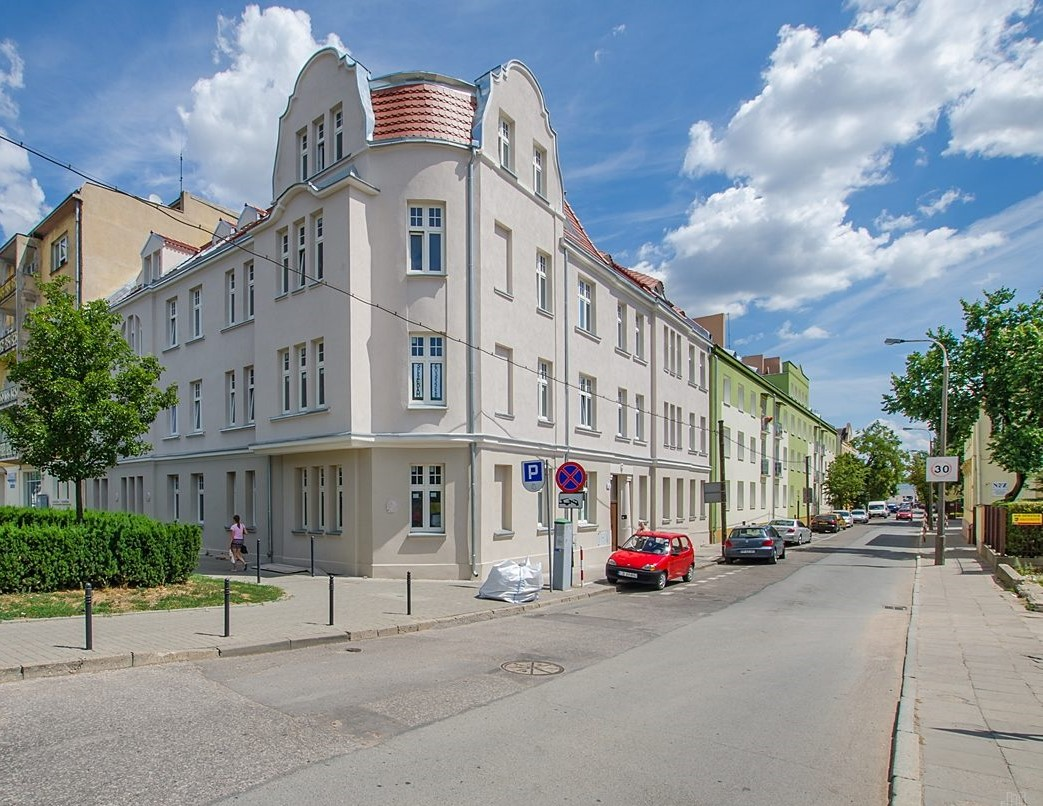
- View of the street eastwards

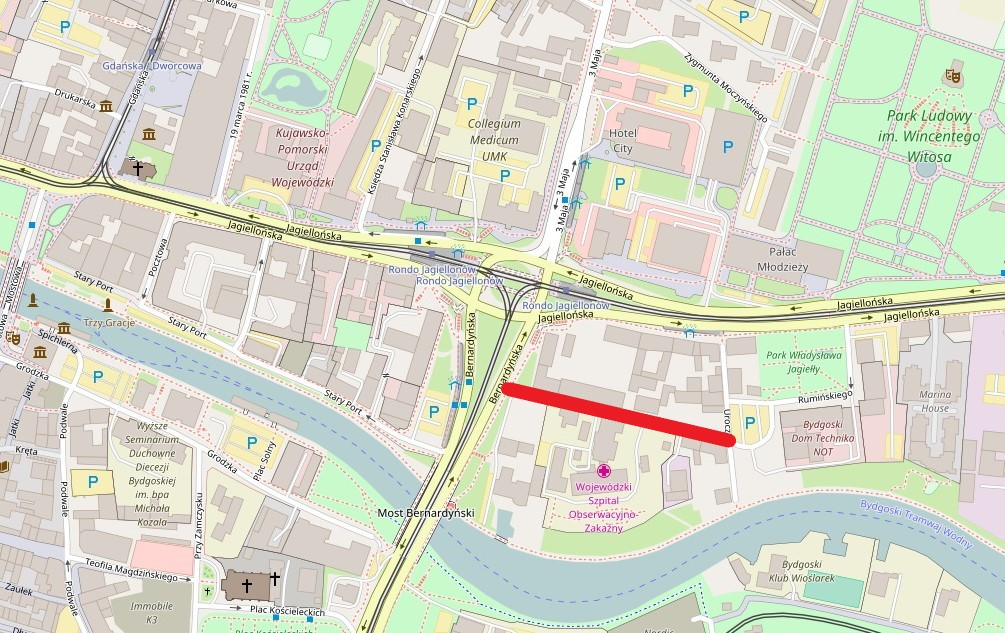
- Świętego Floriana Street highlighted on a map
- Native name: Ulica Świętego Floriana (Polish)
- Former names: Alexander Straße, Frithjof Straße
- Namesake: Saint Florian
- Owner: City of Bydgoszcz
- Length: 200 m (660 ft)Google maps
- Width: ca. 10m
- Area: Downtown district
- Location: Bydgoszcz, Poland

Construction
- Construction start: 1908
- Completed: Early 1940s

Świętego Floriana Street is located in the downtown district of Bydgoszcz, Poland. Despite its short length of roughly 200 metres (660 ft), it features many notable buildings in a variety of architectural styles, including Eclectic, Art Nouveau and early modernist. The street is named after Saint Florian.

== Location ==
The street is located nearby the Brda river, its track running parallel to the water, on a west–east axis. It stems out of Bernardyńska Street in the west and runs between the river and Jagiellońska street.

== History ==
The area originally belonged to a city farm called Grodztwa. The land registry cites that the farm owner successively sold pieces of the estate. Like many of the streets of the downtown district, Świętego Floriana started between the last quarter of the 19th century and the first quarter of the 20th century.

The street bore the following names through time:

- 19th century-1920, Alexander straße
- 1920–1939, Ulica Świętego Floriana
- 1939–1945, Frithjof straße, alluding to Frithiof's Saga
- Since 1945, Ulica Świętego Floriana

== Main edifices ==
Tenement at 3, corner with Bernardyńska Street

1910 by Erich Lindenburger

Eclecticism

Before its erection in the early 20th century, the site was a garden. Carl Hintz, a mailman, was the first registered landlord.

The building was thoroughly restored in 2018. One will notice the entry doorway, flanked by two columns, three medallions depicting figures (among whom a king) and a seal. Corner facades are topped with ogee gables and eyelid dormers.

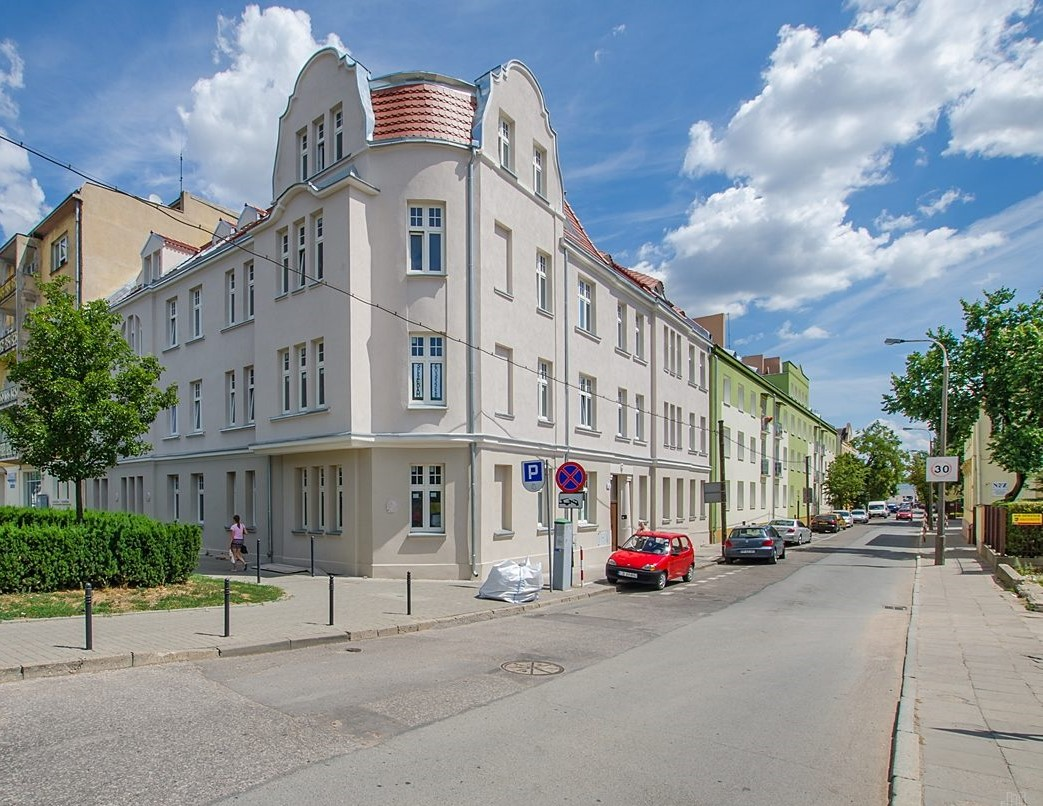
View from Bernardyńska street

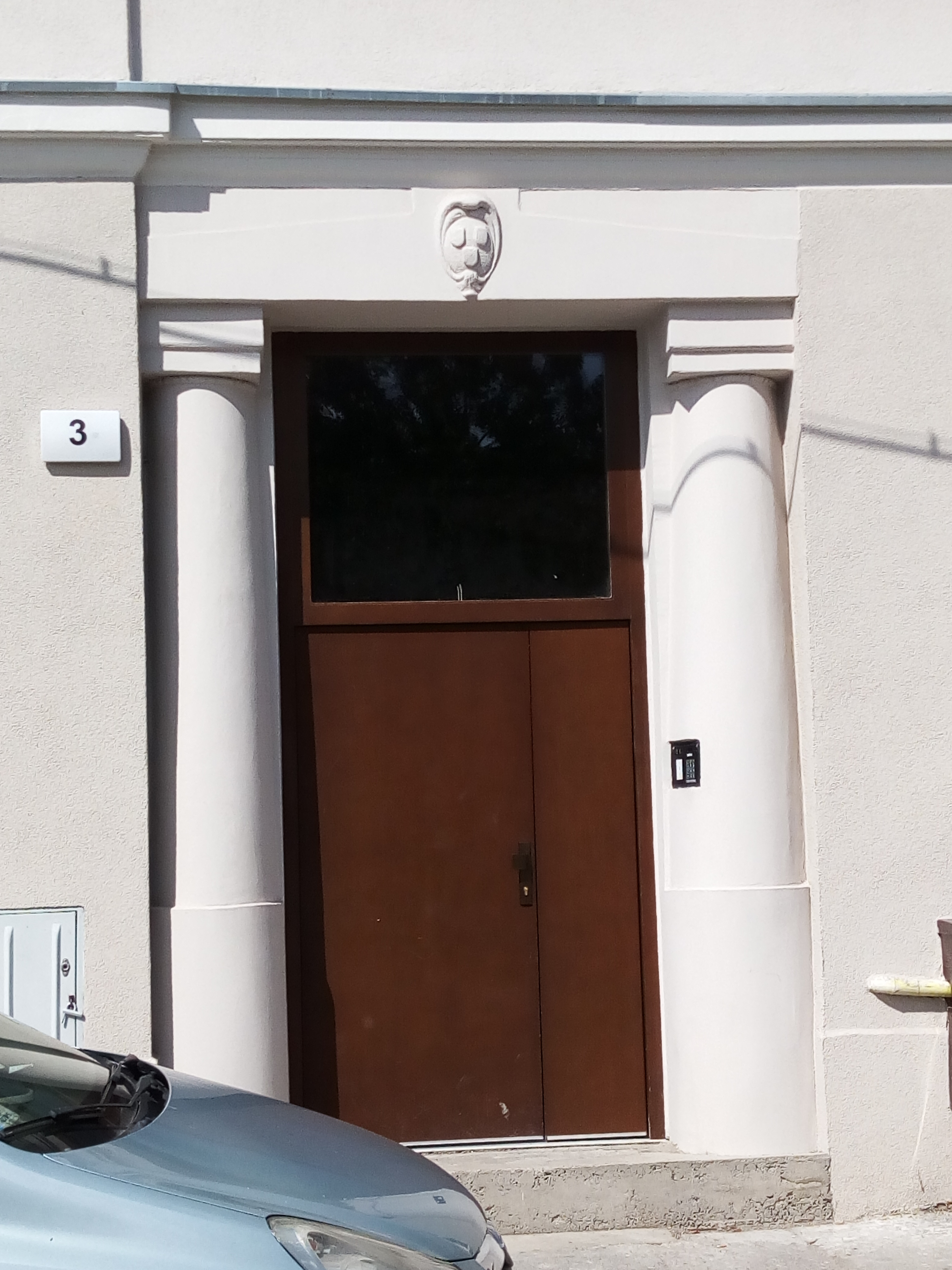
Main door at Nr.3

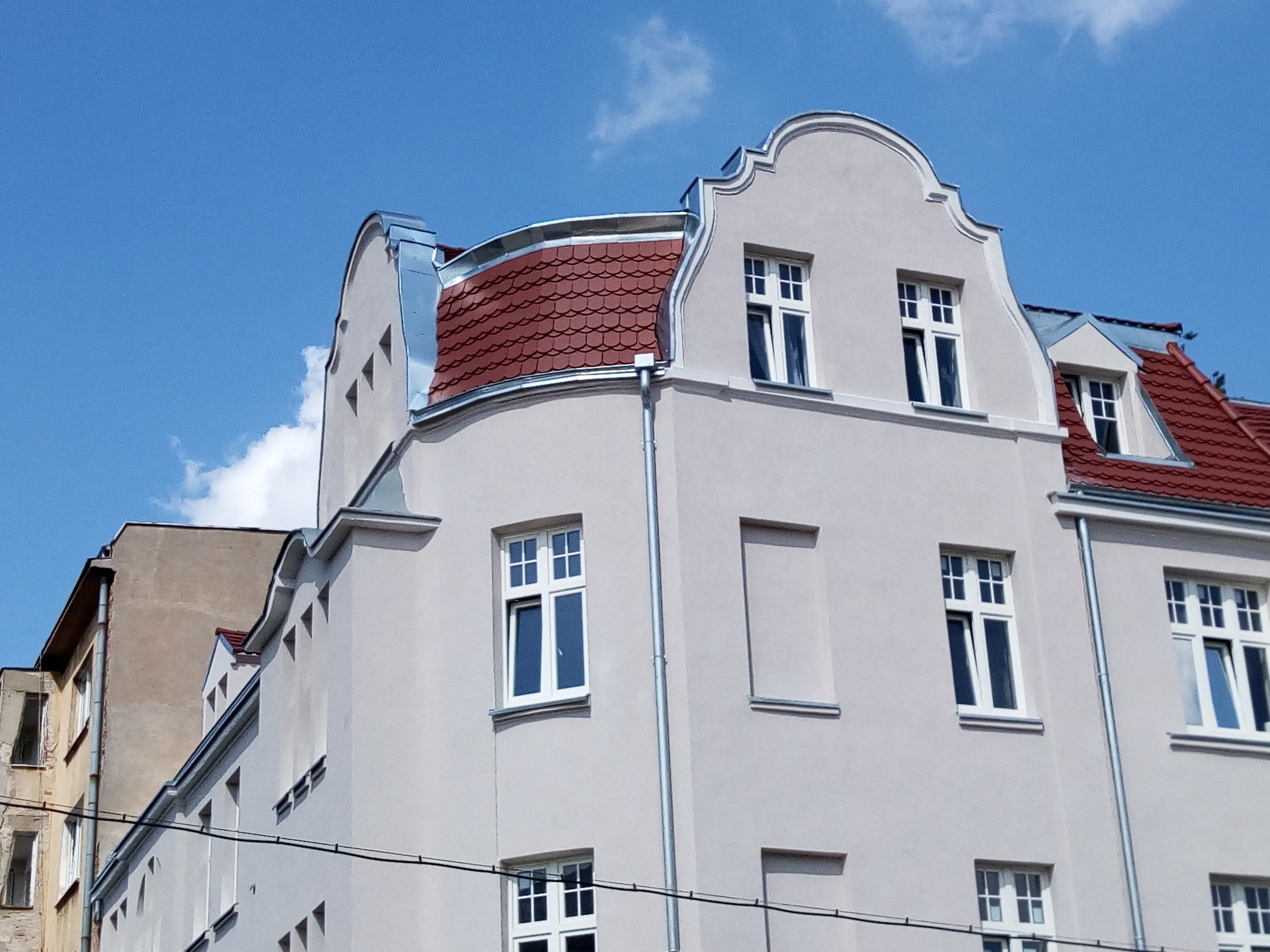
View of the gables

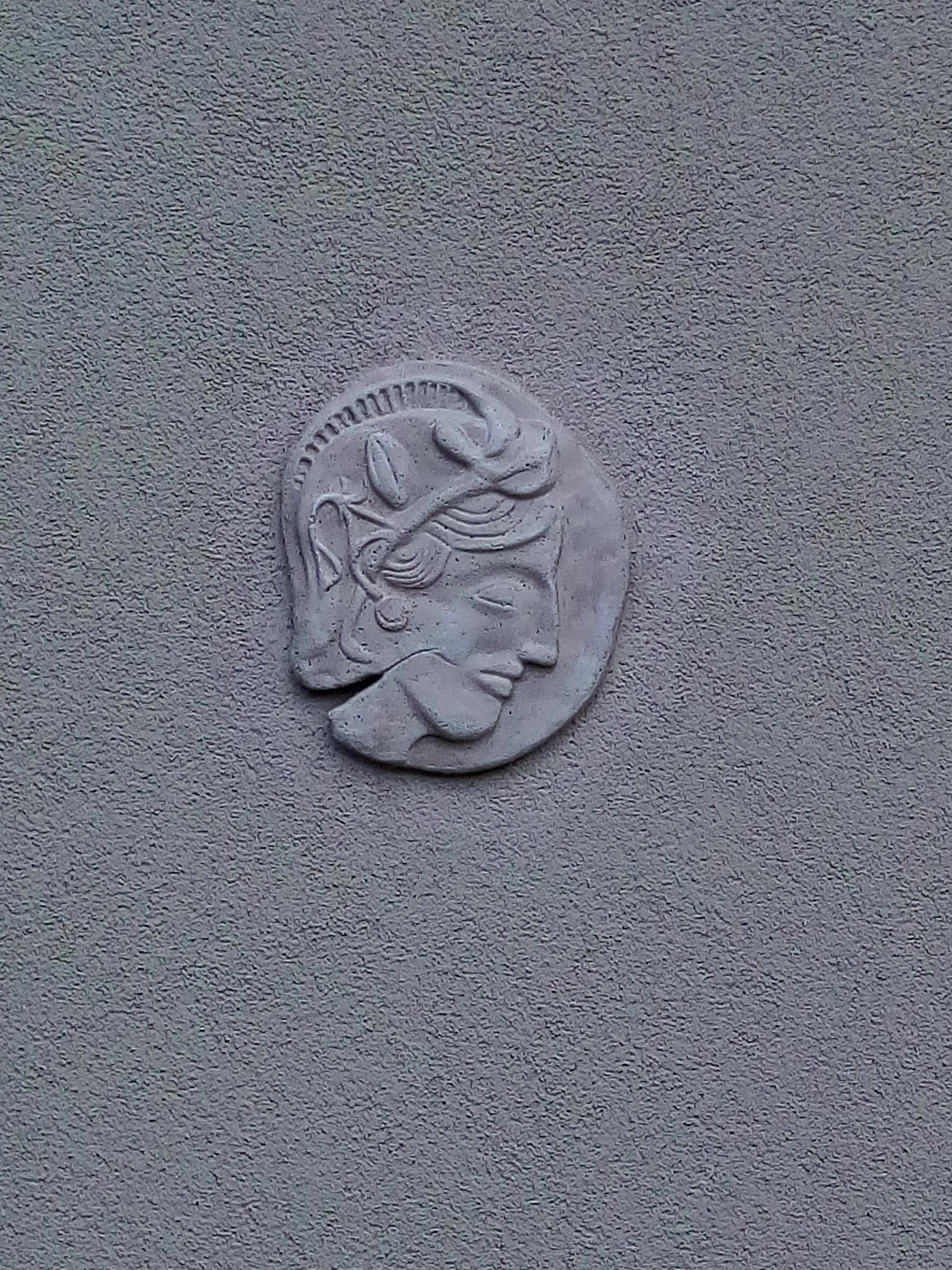
Figure head medallion

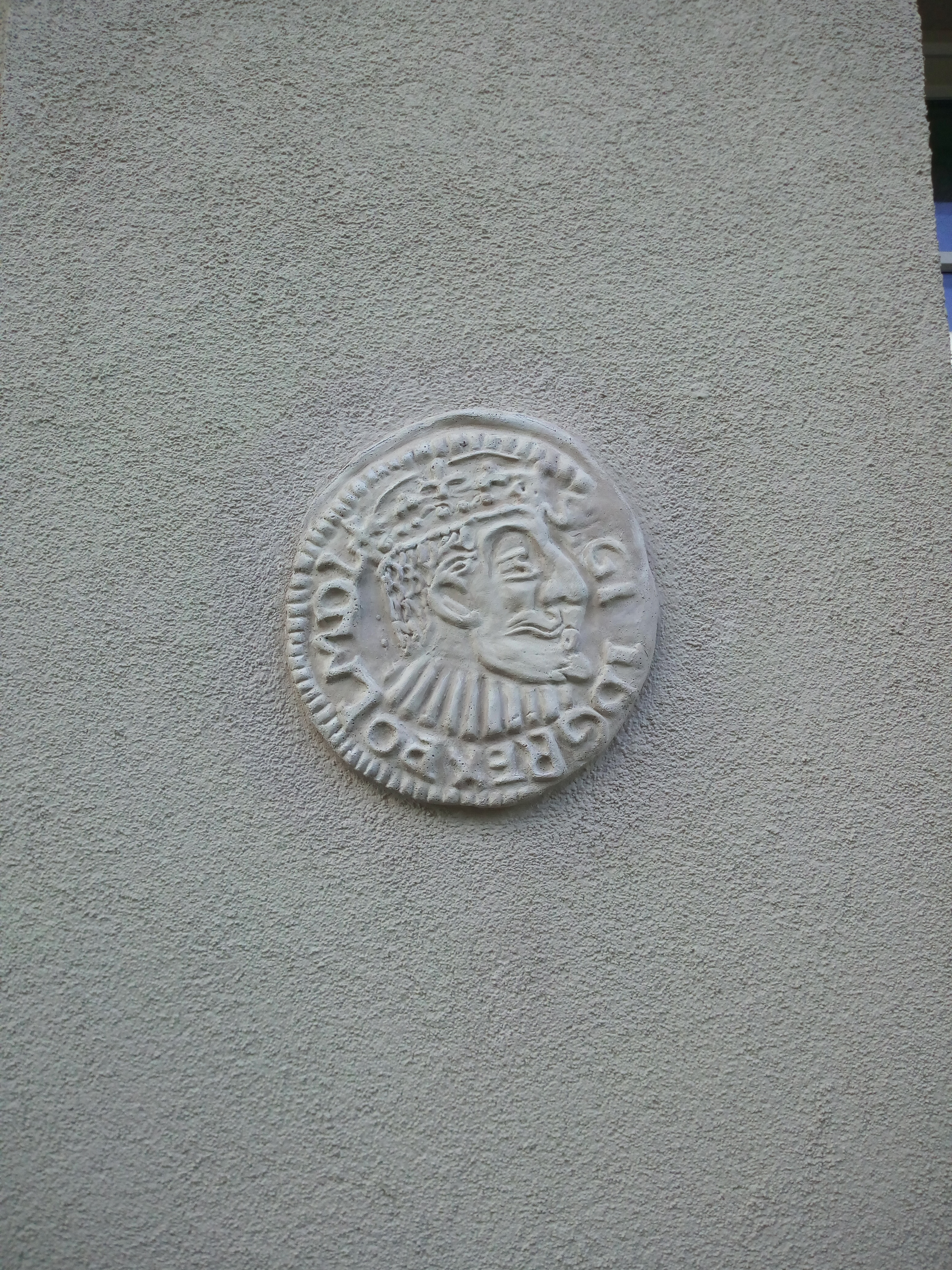
King head medallion

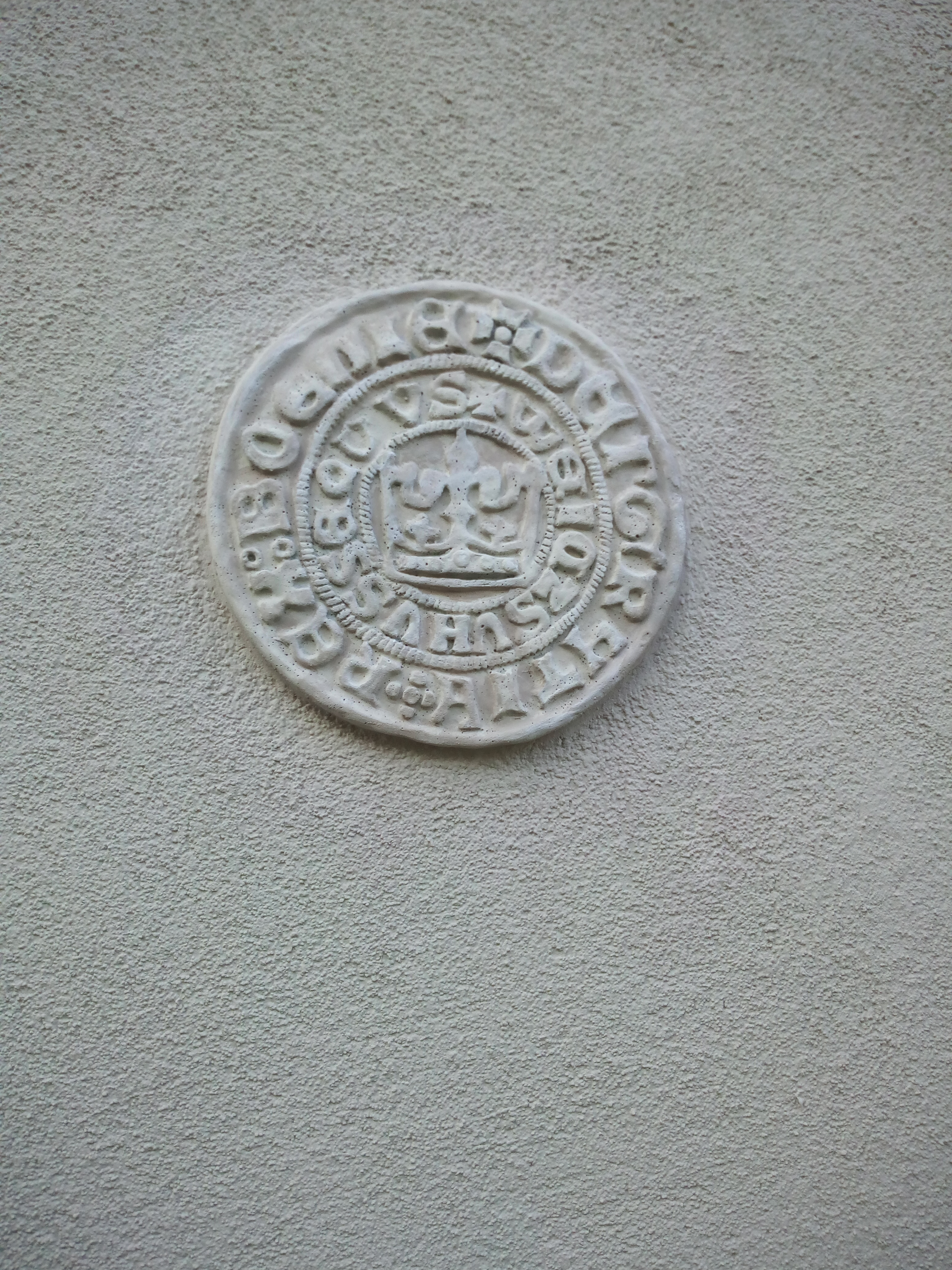
Seal medallion

Tenement at 5/7

Late 1930s

Modern architecture

Those two buildings are part of a series of similar constructions built in downtown Bydgoszcz during that period. Other instances can be found at Gdańska Street, Zamoyskiego Street or 20 Stycznia 1920 Street.

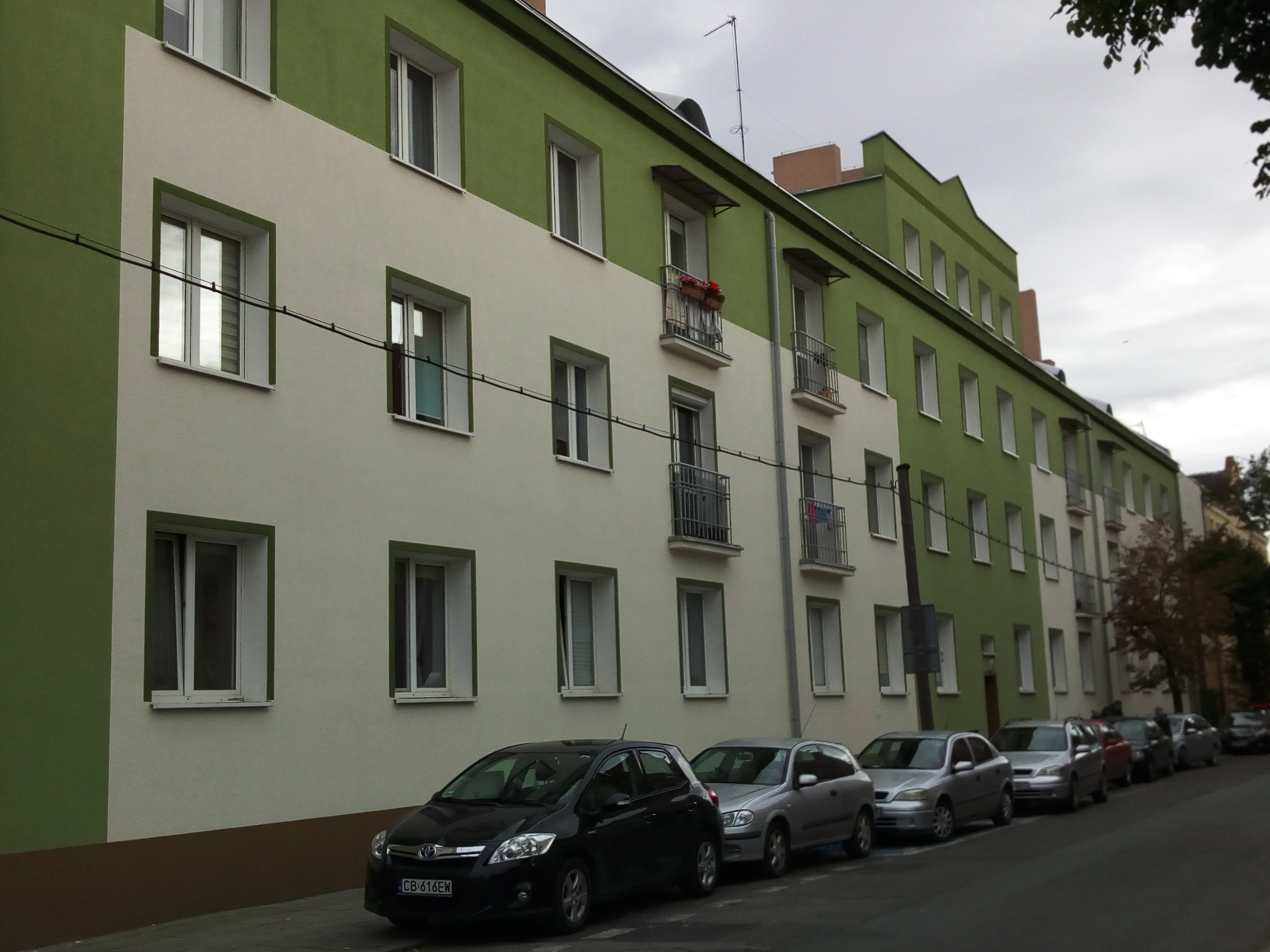
Facades view from the street

Old Building of Bydgoszcz Rowing Association, corner with Bernardyńska Street

Registered on Kuyavian-Pomeranian Heritage list Nr.601291, Reg.A/1091 (January 18, 1994)

1914, by Theodore Patzwald

Historicism

The building was erected by the architect Theodore Patzwald for the German Rowing Club "Frithjof" established in 1894. The club joined from 1923 to 1945 the "Frithjof Rowing Club", a German rowing association. After World War II, the edifice housed the Bydgoszcz Rowing Association, or BTW (Polish: Bydgoskie Towarzystwo Wioślarskie), founded on March 16, 1920, under the name "Tryton Rowing Association" (Polish: Towarzystwo Wioślarzy Tryton Bydgoszcz). In 1996, the building was sold by municipal authorities to a company, Shanghai Olym-Poland, which set up a hotel and a catering center for Chinese people traveling in Poland and around Europe. In 2010, the building became a hotel with a gastronomic restaurant Zatoka ("The Gulf").

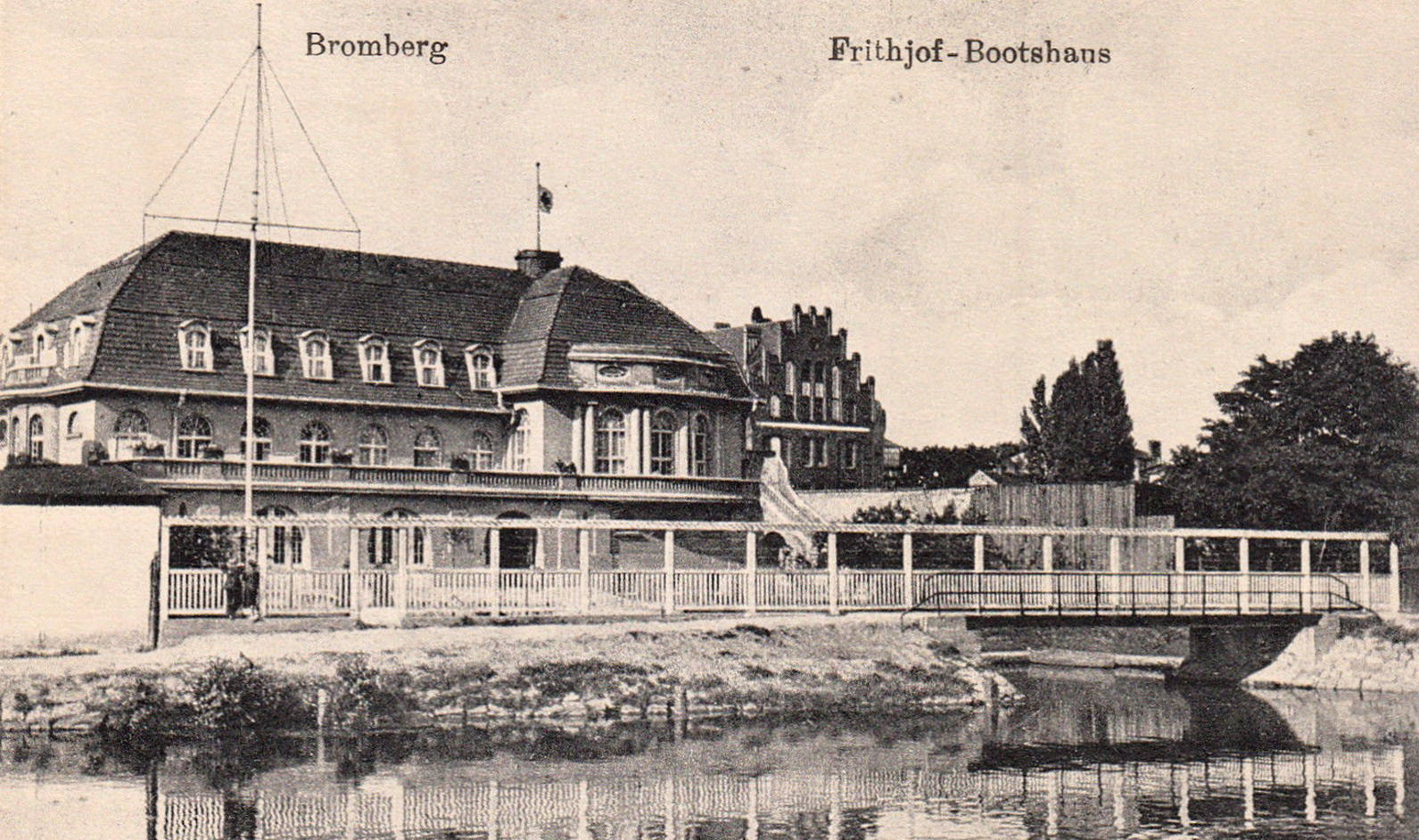
Building of German Rowing Club "Frithjof" 1917

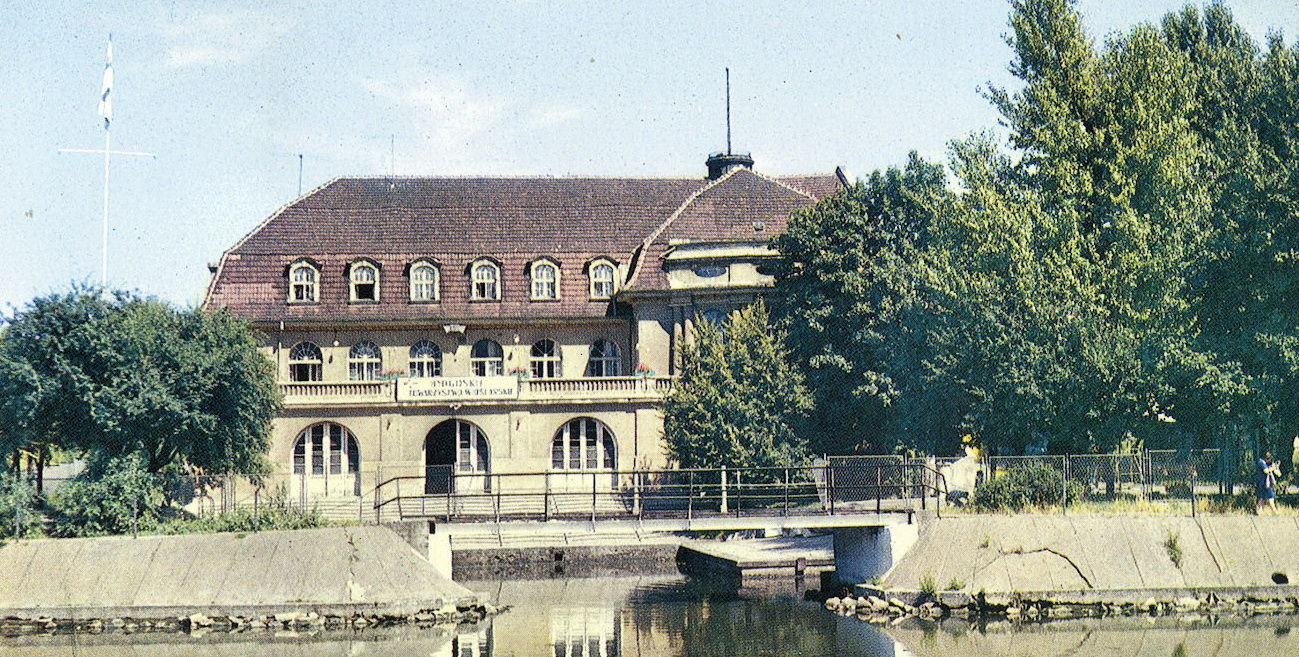
Building of Rowing association "BTW" 1973

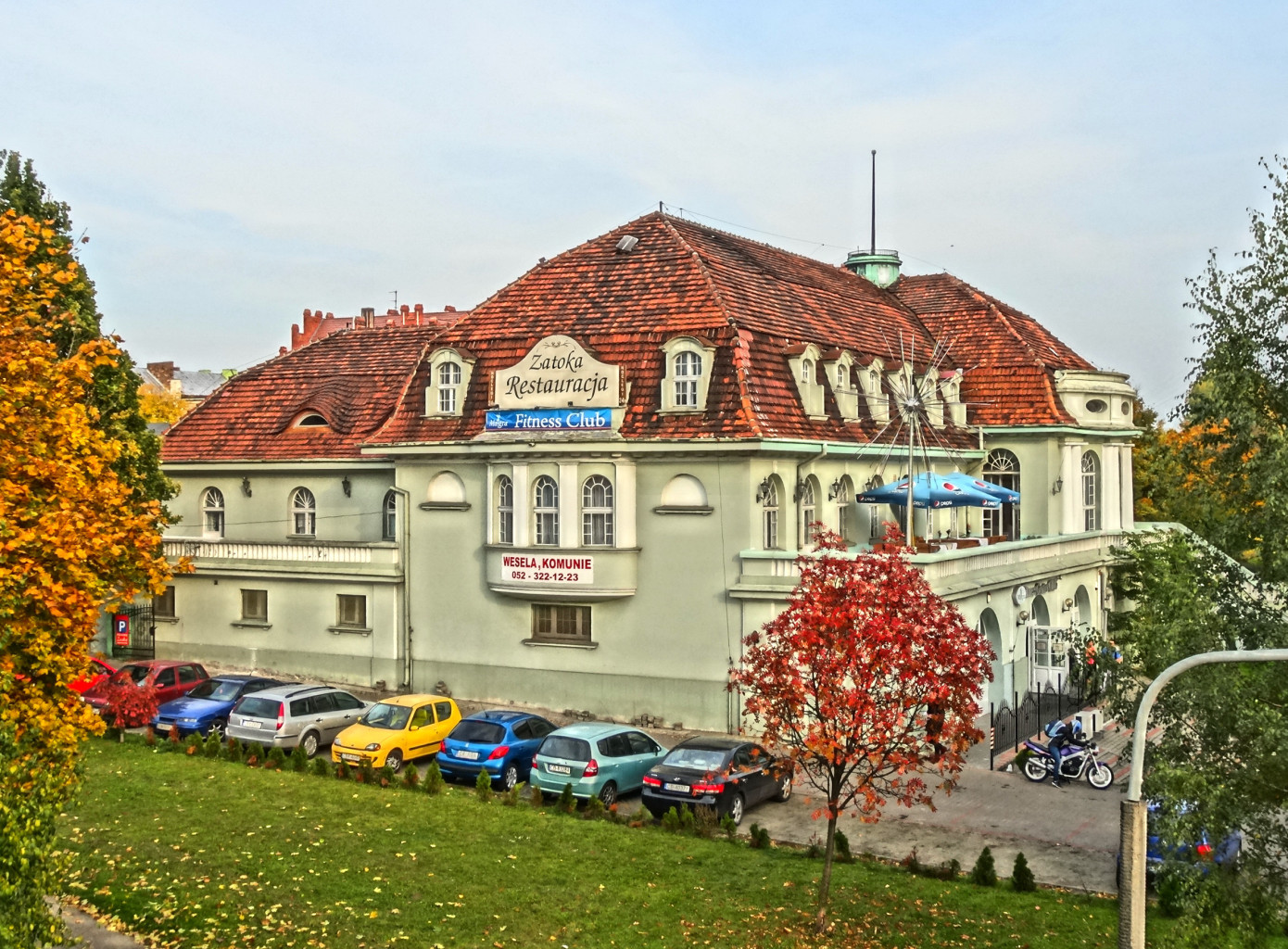
View from Bernardyński Bridge

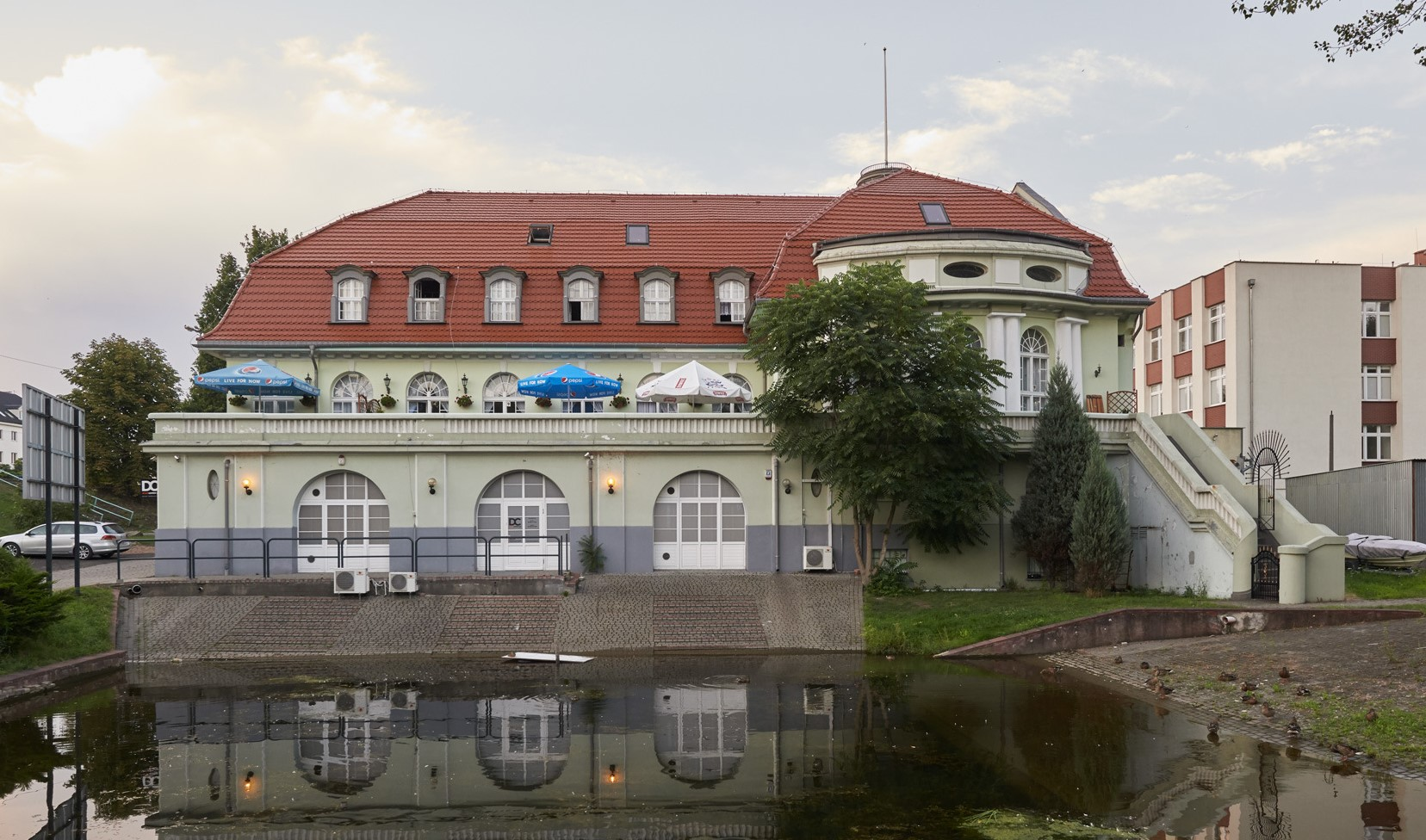
View from Brda river's opposite side

Tenement at N9

1910, by Max Mielke

Early modernism

The plot at then Alexanderstraße 5 was first occupied by an insurance bank, Bersicherungsbank Teutonia till the start of the 20th century. In 1910, Mr Schlegel had this tenement built: however, he never inhabited it.

The frontage still keeps its former shape with its large wall gable, the four balconies and some tiny motifs, bringing to mind a fading Art Nouveau influence.

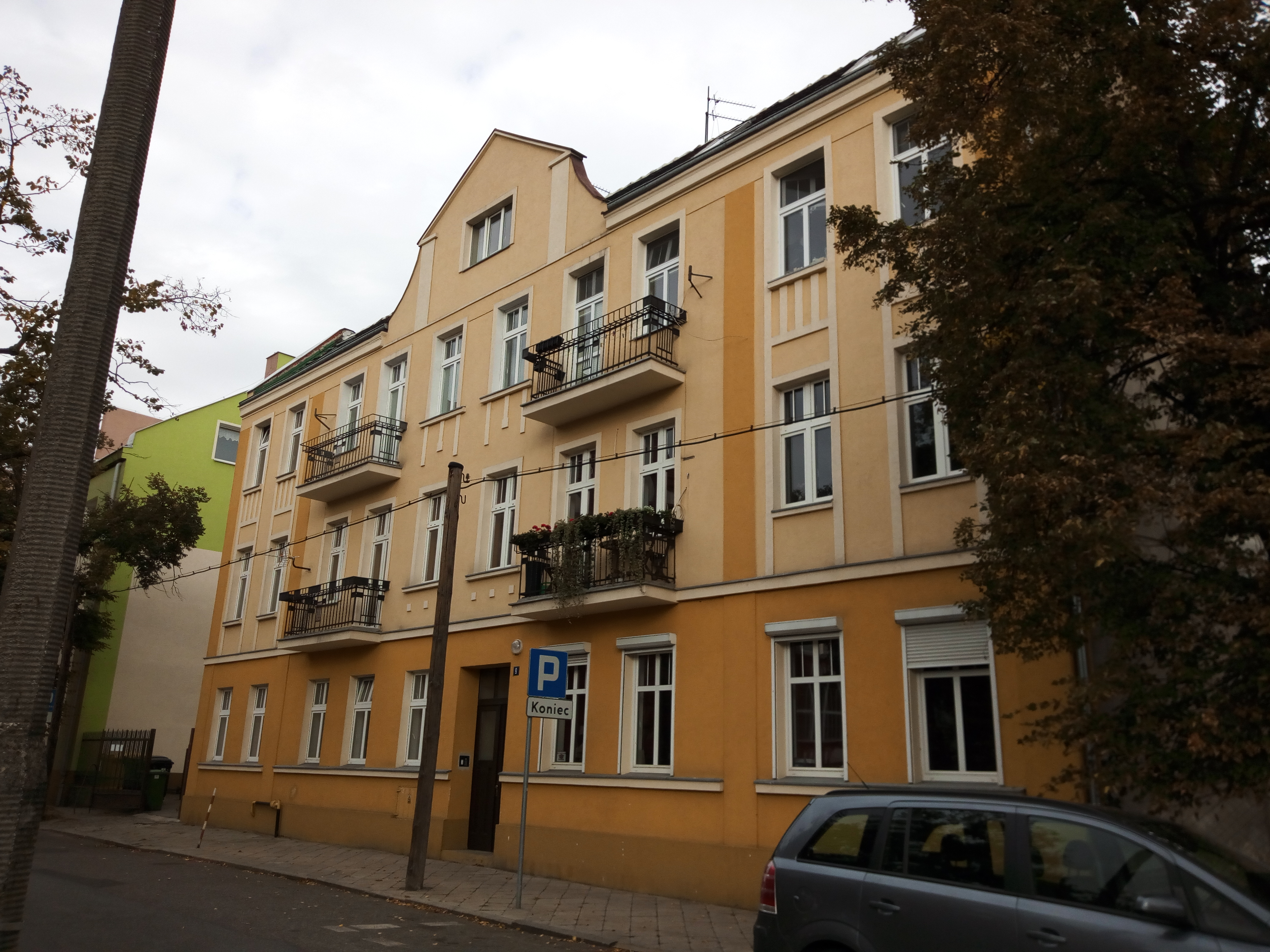
Main facade

Tadeusz Browicz Hospital for Infectious Diseases in Bydgoszcz, at 10/18

1898, 1911 by Józef Święcicki

In 1885, the plot was purchased by priest Antoni Kielczynski, with the plan that the Daughters of Charity of Saint Vincent de Paul, based in Chełmno, would settle there. However, it was not before 1909 that the congregation officially took possession of the place. On May 4, 1898, with the participation of the parish priest of Bydgoszcz, Józef Choraszewski, city authorities, doctors and donors, a 12-bed hospital for children opened. The Bromberg address book from 1900 lists sisters with the following surnames living in the premises: Doliwa, Gralewska, Hermanska, Hoppe, Kapke, Schmidt. At that time, there was only a one-story building in the yard with several rooms containing beds for patients. Sisters even organised summer camps. In 1901, thanks to the help of the countess Potulicka, a separate branch for infectious children was organized in a separate building. In the years 1905–1906, about 200 children lived in the facility. In 1905, the recorded board of trustees comprised, among others, Parson Ryszard Markwart and Dr. Stanisław Warminski. The latter, the uncle and tutor of Emil Warmiński, donated in 1906 all his savings to the hospital, allowing the construction of one of the ancient brick building.

At that time, the hospital had 36 beds and was maintained only by donations from Poles and landowners, among whom countess Potulicka and entrepreneurs Bronisław Kentzer and Antoni Weynerowski.

In 1914, a hospital for wounded German soldiers opened in a section of the building. After 1920, both children and adults were treated at the hospital. In 1940, the Sisters of Charity were expelled from the premises, taken over by German forces who again used it as a military hospital. In spring 1946, it became a Polish Garrison hospital which was transferred to Toruń in 1948; the buildings then returned to their civilian goal. Recently, the clinic has developed a specialized HIV/AIDS research department and has become a reference center for HIV infections. In 2011, thanks to Kuyavian-Pomeranian Voivodeship funds, a modern building has opened next to the ancient ones, which keep administration offices and some laboratories. On January 29, 2019, the hospital celebrated its 70th anniversary as a Center for Infectious Diseases.

The Neo-Gothic project, designed by builder W. Pluciński from Chełmno, was also realized by Józef Święcicki. It opened on May 6, 1910.

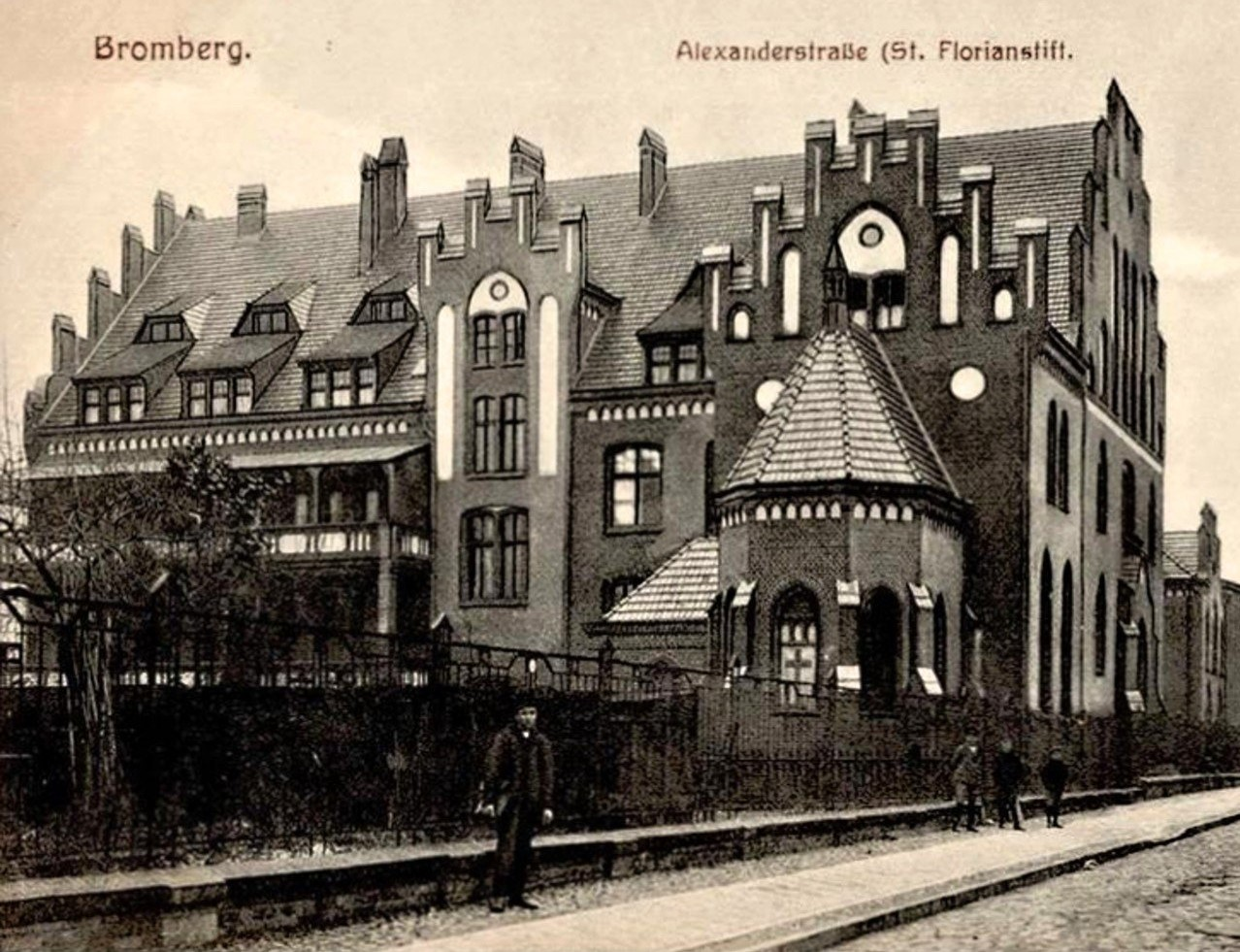
Building ca 1910

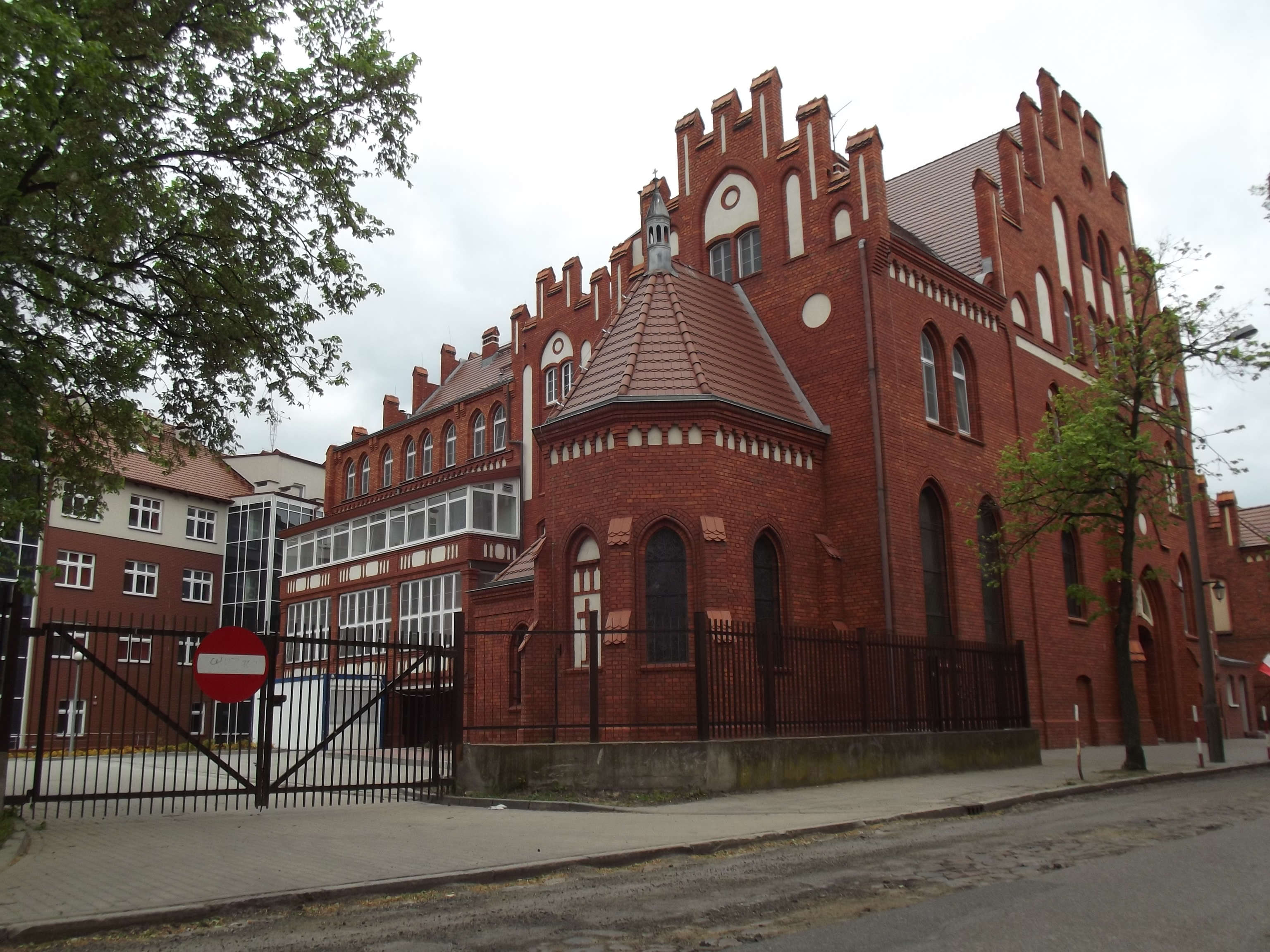
Main building from the street

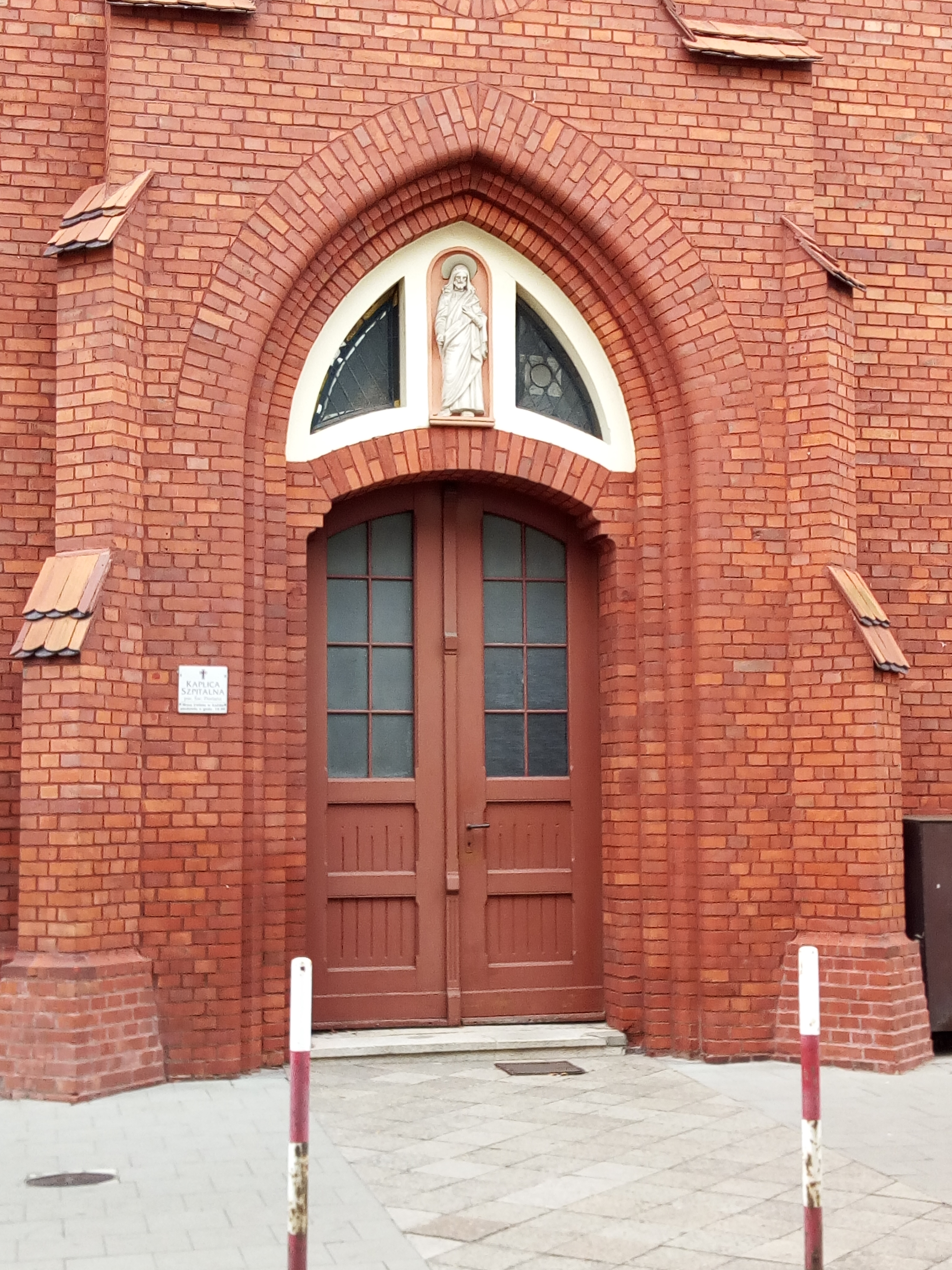
Detail of the main door

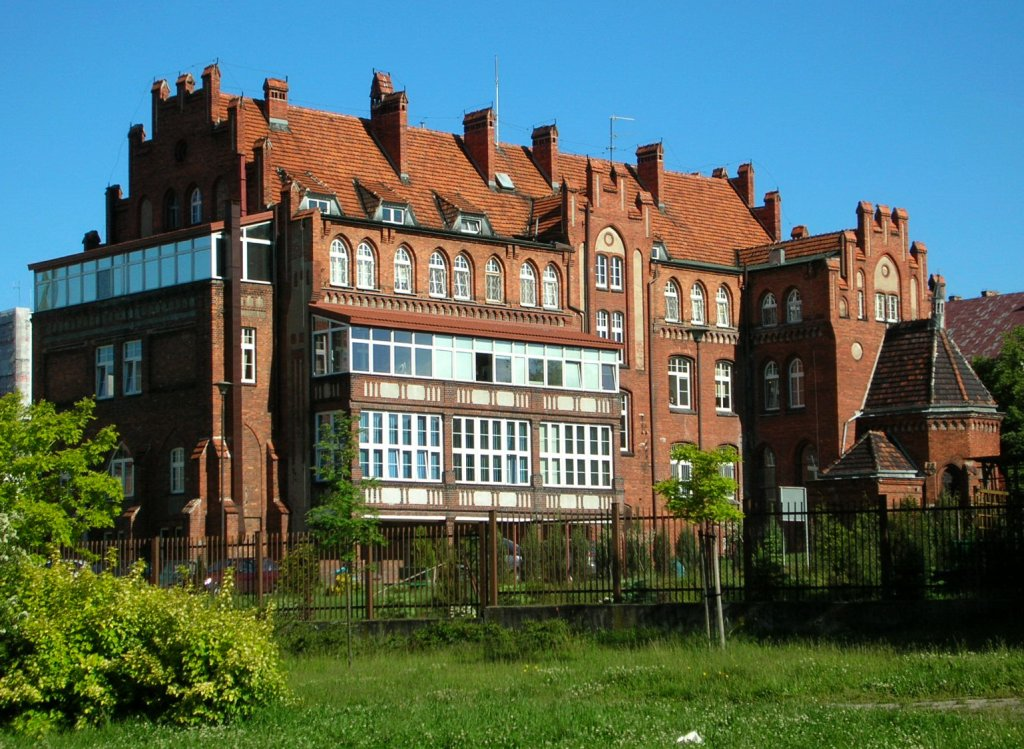
Ancient building from the Brda river

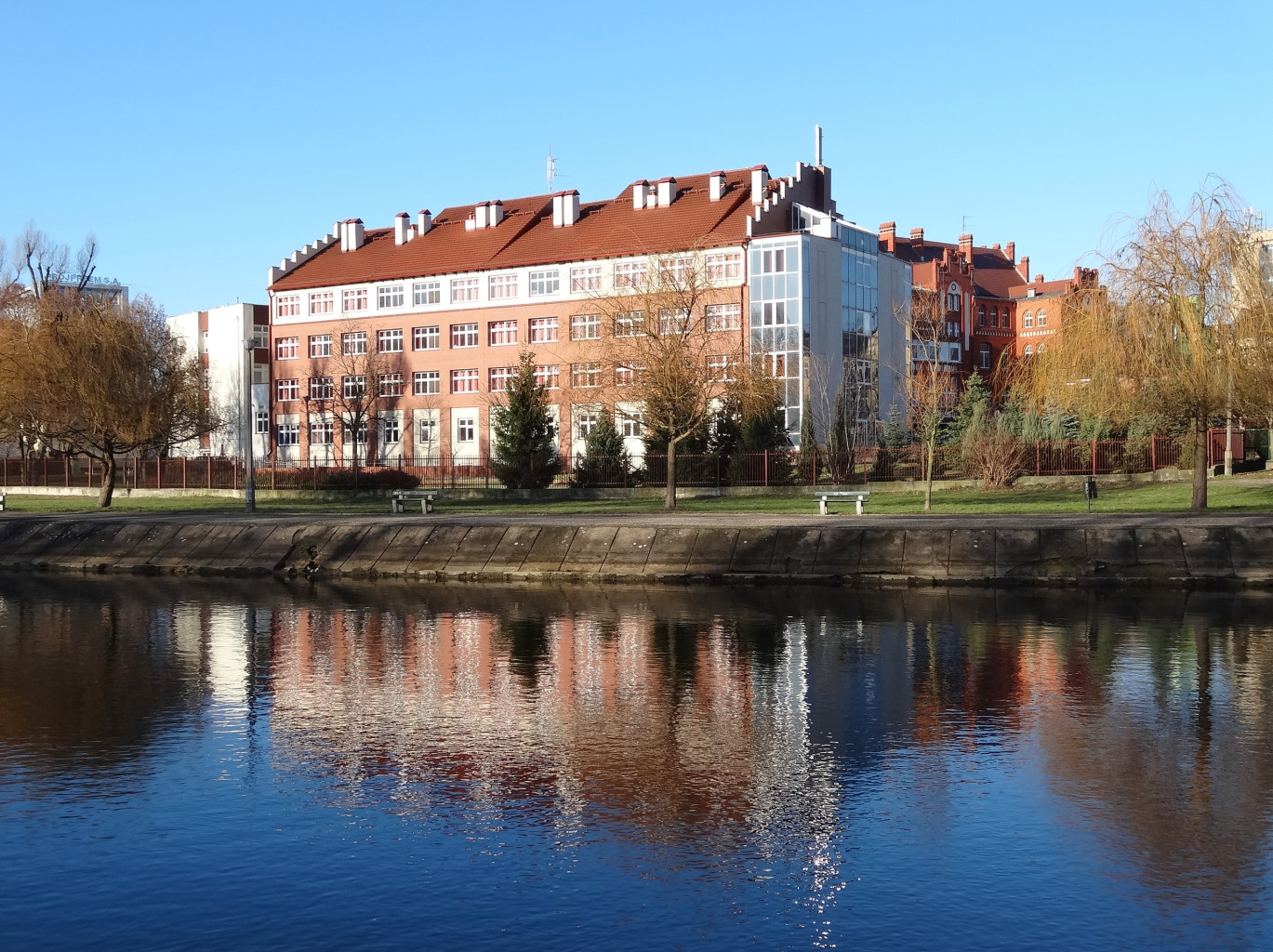
New building from the Brda river

Tenement at 22

1880s

Eclecticism

The original address was Alexanderstraße 8, and the first recorded landlord was Julius Jacoby, a merchant dealing with construction materials. He kept ownership till the end of WWI. A sign bearing his name is still visible on the corner facade.

Both facades display eclectic features, which were fashionable at the time: round or triangular pediments on openings, a Mansard roof and a decorated main door (although in need of restoration) with a transom light window.

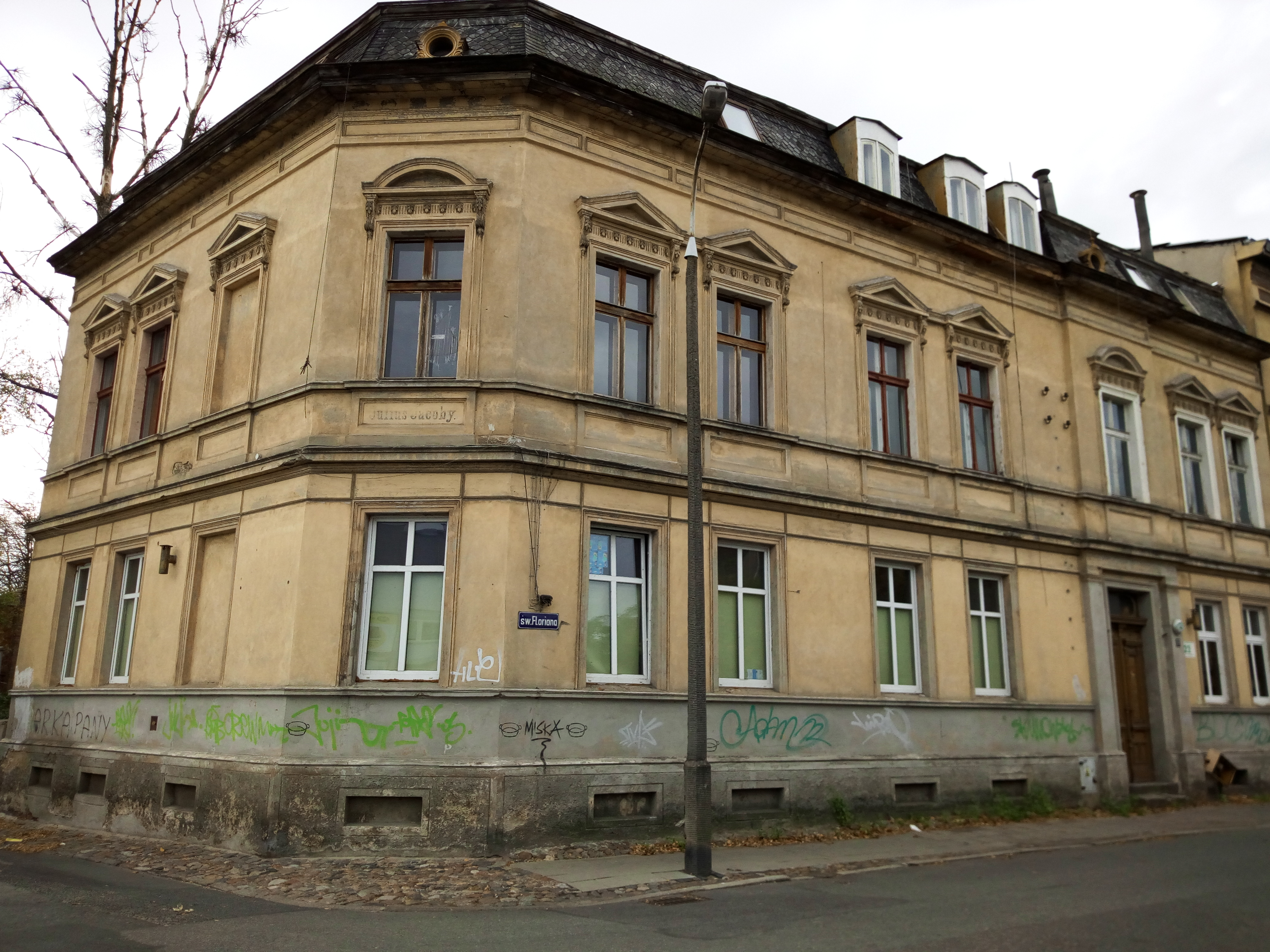
Main elevations from the street

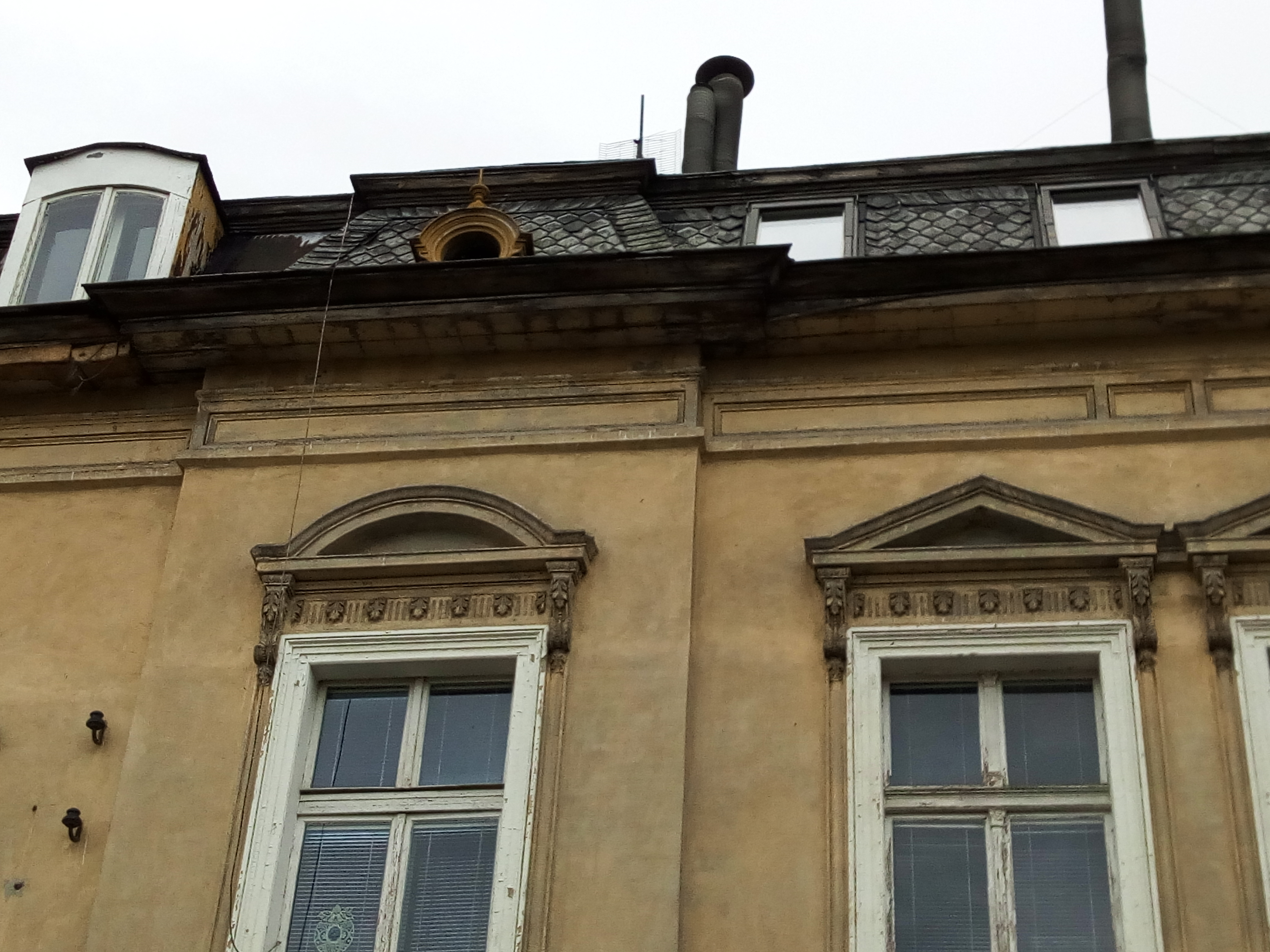
Openings adornment motifs

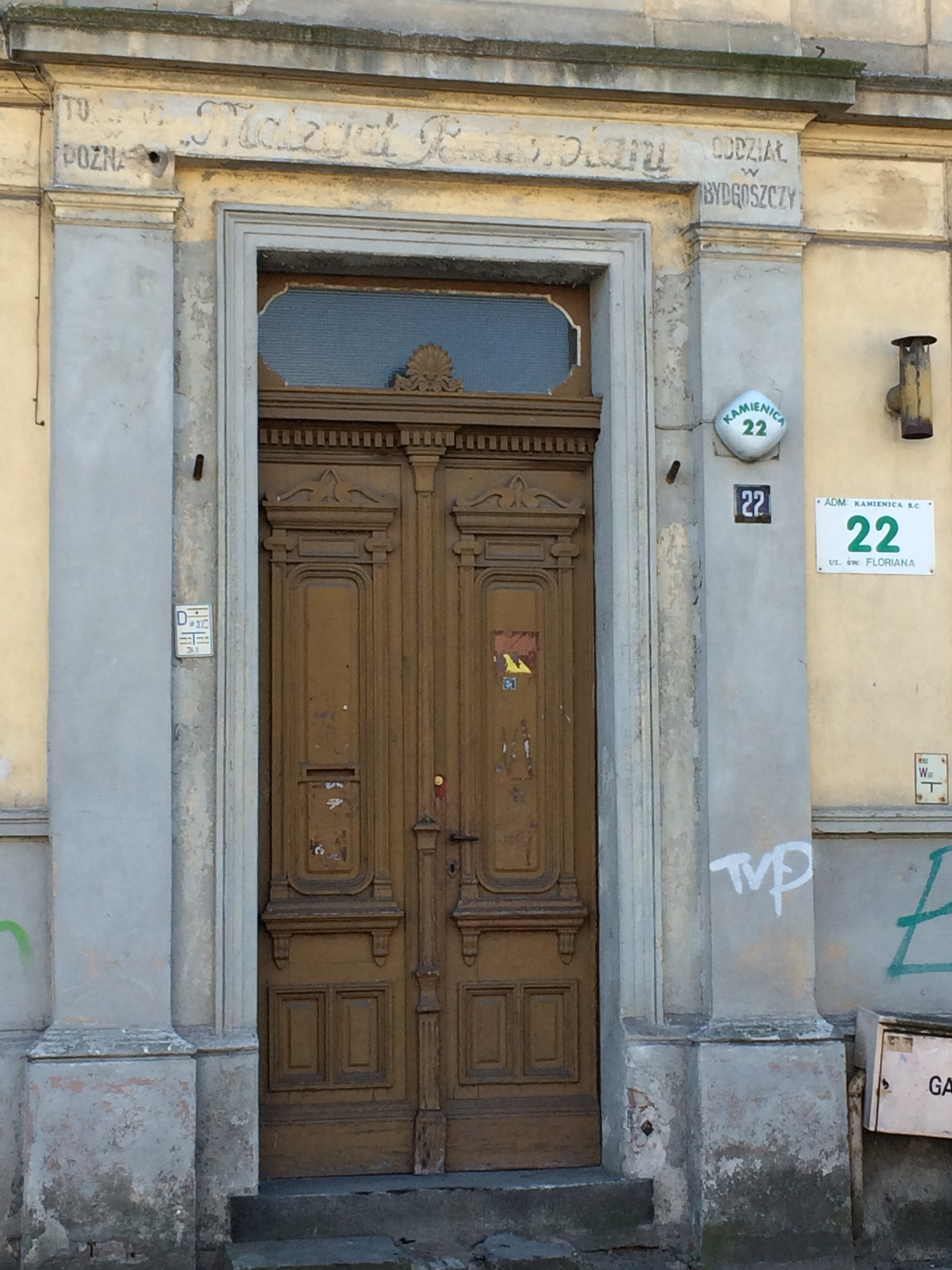
Main entrance

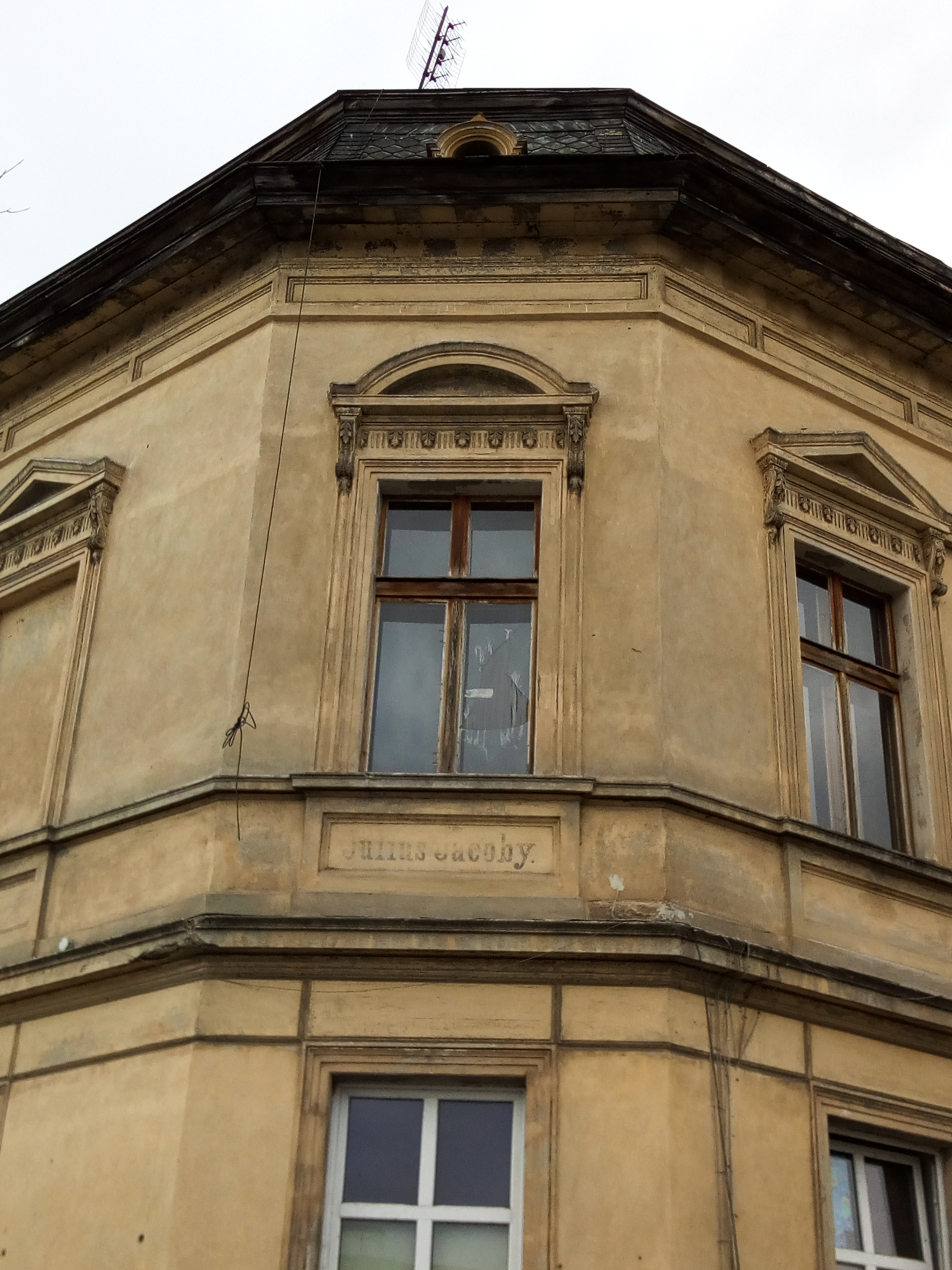
Details of the writing Julius Jacoby

== See also ==
- 20 Stycznia 1920 Street in Bydgoszcz
- Jagiellońska street in Bydgoszcz
- Bernardyńska Street in Bydgoszcz
- Bydgoszcz

== Bibliography ==
- Bręczewska-Kulesza, Daria (2004). Nowoczesna dzielnica mieszkaniowa z początku XX w. Kronika Bydgoska T26 (in Polish). Bydgoszcz: Towarzystwo Miłosnikow Miasta Bydgoszczy-Bydgoskie Towarzystwo Naukowe. p. 82.
- Boguszyński, Mieczysław (2008). Od warsztatu balwierskiego do szpitala klinicznego (in Polish). Bydgoszcz: Towarzystwo Miłośników Miasta Bydgoszczy. ISBN 978-83-926423-0-5.
