= Motyl, Kuyavian-Pomeranian Voivodeship =

Motyl
- Village
- Location within Poland
- Coordinates: 53°25′44″N 17°49′19″E
- Country: Poland
- Voivodeship: Kuyavian-Pomeranian
- County: Tuchola
- Gmina: Gostycyn
- Population: 106

Motyl [ˈmɔtɨl] is a village in the administrative district of Gmina Gostycyn, within Tuchola County, Kuyavian-Pomeranian Voivodeship, in north-central Poland.
