= Łyskowo, Kuyavian-Pomeranian Voivodeship =

Łyskowo
- Village
- Location within Poland
- Coordinates: 53°31′44″N 17°50′52″E
- Country: Poland
- Voivodeship: Kuyavian-Pomeranian
- County: Tuchola
- Gmina: Gostycyn
- Population: 390

Łyskowo [wɨsˈkɔvɔ] is a village in the administrative district of Gmina Gostycyn, within Tuchola County, Kuyavian-Pomeranian Voivodeship, in north-central Poland.
