= Świt, Gmina Gostycyn =

Świt
- Village
- Location within Poland
- Coordinates: 53°32′26″N 17°53′3″E
- Country: Poland
- Voivodeship: Kuyavian-Pomeranian
- County: Tuchola
- Gmina: Gostycyn

Świt [ɕfit] is a village in the administrative district of Gmina Gostycyn, within Tuchola County, Kuyavian-Pomeranian Voivodeship, in north-central Poland.
