= Wielka Klonia =

- Village
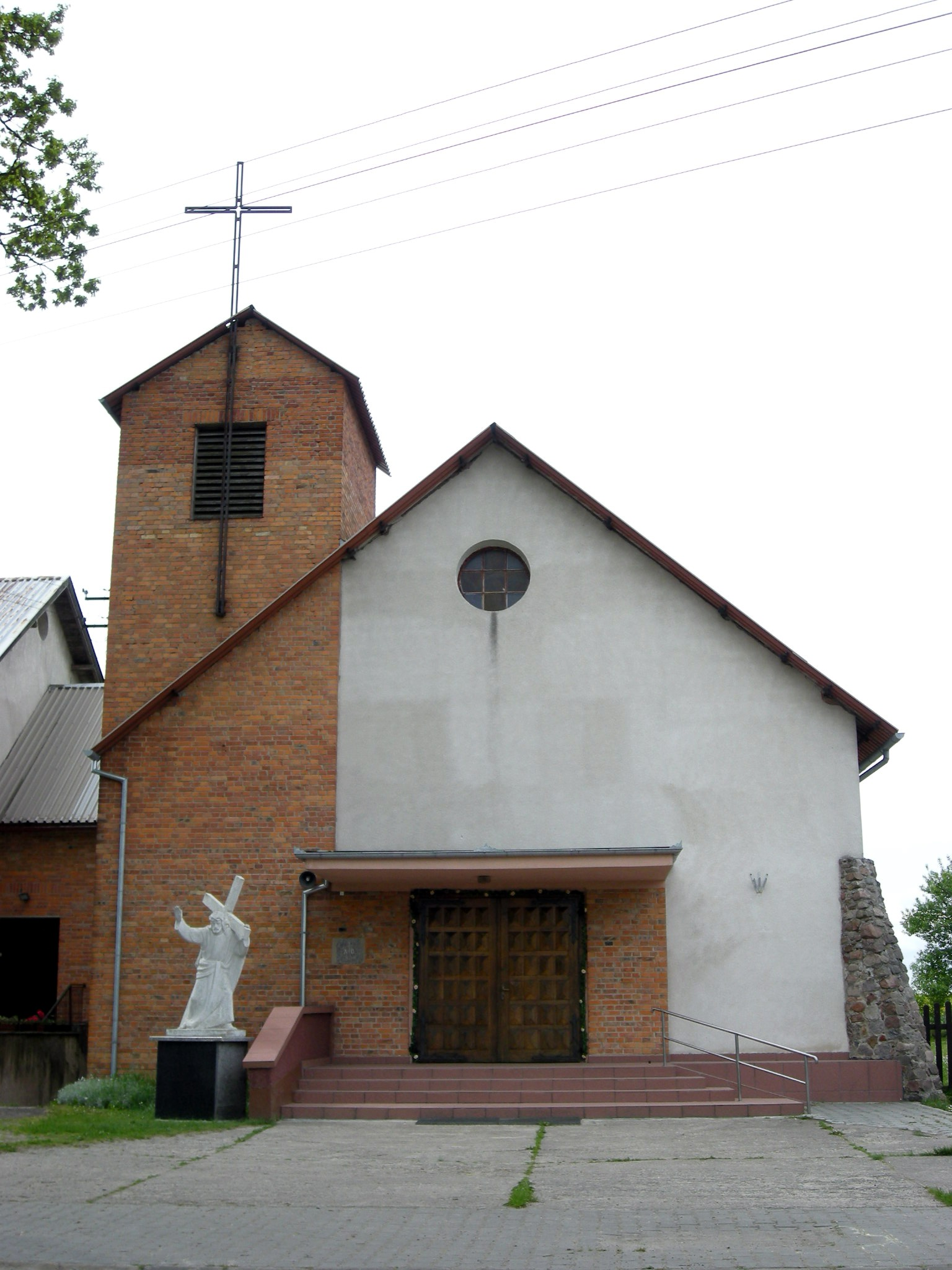
- Church of the Nativity of the Virgin Mary in Wielka Klonia

- Location within Poland
- Coordinates: 53°29′N 17°45′E
- Country: Poland
- Voivodeship: Kuyavian-Pomeranian
- County: Tuchola
- Gmina: Gostycyn
- Population: 470
- Time zone: UTC+1 (CET)
  - Summer (DST): UTC+2 (CEST)
- Vehicle registration: CTU

Wielka Klonia [ˈvjɛlka ˈklɔɲa] is a village in the administrative district of Gmina Gostycyn, within Tuchola County, Kuyavian-Pomeranian Voivodeship, in north-central Poland.

== History ==
During the German occupation of Poland (World War II), Wielka Klonia was one of the sites of executions of Poles, carried out by the Germans in 1939 as part of the Intelligenzaktion. Polish farmers from Wielka Klonia were also among the victims of large massacres of Poles from the region, perpetrated by the Selbstschutz in 1939 in nearby Rudzki Most. In the spring of 1940, the occupiers carried out expulsions of Poles, who then were enslaved as forced labour of German colonists in the area. The expelled Poles were farm owners and families of the victims of earlier massacres of Poles. Local Poles were also among the victims of a massacre of Poles, committed by the Germans on 3 November 1940 in nearby Bralewnica. The families of the victims were also soon expelled. Further expulsions of Polish inhabitants were carried out in 1942 and 1943, and the Poles were deported to the Potulice concentration camp. Houses of expelled Poles were handed over to German colonists as part of the Lebensraum policy.
