= Mała Klonia, Kuyavian-Pomeranian Voivodeship =

Mała Klonia
- Village
- Location within Poland
- Coordinates: 53°28′N 17°45′E
- Country: Poland
- Voivodeship: Kuyavian-Pomeranian
- County: Tuchola
- Gmina: Gostycyn
- Time zone: UTC+1 (CET)
  - Summer (DST): UTC+2 (CEST)
- Vehicle registration: CTU

Mała Klonia [ˈmawa ˈklɔɲa] is a village in the administrative district of Gmina Gostycyn, within Tuchola County, Kuyavian-Pomeranian Voivodeship, in north-central Poland.

== History ==
During the German occupation of Poland (World War II), Mała Klonia was one of the sites of executions of Poles, carried out by the Germans in 1939 as part of the Intelligenzaktion. A local teacher was among the victims of large massacres of Poles from the region, perpetrated by the Selbstschutz in 1939 in nearby Rudzki Most. In 1942–1943, the occupiers carried out expulsions of Poles, who were deported to the Potulice concentration camp, while their houses were handed over to new German colonists as part of the Lebensraum policy.
