= Piła, Kuyavian-Pomeranian Voivodeship =

Piła
- Village
- Location within Poland
- Coordinates: 53°30′N 17°53′E
- Country: Poland
- Voivodeship: Kuyavian-Pomeranian
- County: Tuchola
- Gmina: Gostycyn

Piła [ˈpiwa] is a village in the administrative district of Gmina Gostycyn, within Tuchola County, Kuyavian-Pomeranian Voivodeship, in north-central Poland.

== Climate ==
Piła has an oceanic climate (Köppen Cfb).

Climate data for Piła (WMO ID: 12230; coordinates 53.13°N 16.75°E; elevation: 72 m (236 ft), 1991–2020 normals, extremes 1970–present)
Month	Jan	Feb	Mar	Apr	May	Jun	Jul	Aug	Sep	Oct	Nov	Dec	Year
Record high °C (°F)	13.9 (57.0)	18.3 (64.9)	22.3 (72.1)	29.9 (85.8)	31.6 (88.9)	37.4 (99.3)	37.4 (99.3)	37.2 (99.0)	34.7 (94.5)	25.2 (77.4)	17.7 (63.9)	14.1 (57.4)	37.4 (99.3)
Mean maximum °C (°F)	8.9 (48.0)	10.2 (50.4)	17.0 (62.6)	23.7 (74.7)	27.6 (81.7)	30.9 (87.6)	32.2 (90.0)	31.8 (89.2)	26.3 (79.3)	20.3 (68.5)	13.2 (55.8)	9.7 (49.5)	33.9 (93.0)
Mean daily maximum °C (°F)	1.8 (35.2)	3.4 (38.1)	7.8 (46.0)	14.6 (58.3)	19.4 (66.9)	22.6 (72.7)	24.8 (76.6)	24.4 (75.9)	19.0 (66.2)	12.9 (55.2)	6.5 (43.7)	2.9 (37.2)	13.3 (55.9)
Daily mean °C (°F)	−0.8 (30.6)	0.2 (32.4)	3.2 (37.8)	8.7 (47.7)	13.5 (56.3)	16.8 (62.2)	19.0 (66.2)	18.4 (65.1)	13.6 (56.5)	8.5 (47.3)	3.9 (39.0)	0.6 (33.1)	8.8 (47.8)
Mean daily minimum °C (°F)	−3.5 (25.7)	−2.9 (26.8)	−0.9 (30.4)	2.9 (37.2)	7.4 (45.3)	10.9 (51.6)	13.2 (55.8)	12.7 (54.9)	8.7 (47.7)	4.7 (40.5)	1.3 (34.3)	−1.9 (28.6)	4.4 (39.9)
Mean minimum °C (°F)	−14.7 (5.5)	−12.3 (9.9)	−8.8 (16.2)	−4.4 (24.1)	−0.6 (30.9)	4.3 (39.7)	7.4 (45.3)	5.8 (42.4)	1.1 (34.0)	−3.3 (26.1)	−5.8 (21.6)	−11.2 (11.8)	−17.4 (0.7)
Record low °C (°F)	−30.0 (−22.0)	−24.9 (−12.8)	−20.3 (−4.5)	−9.8 (14.4)	−5.3 (22.5)	−1.6 (29.1)	1.7 (35.1)	1.2 (34.2)	−4.0 (24.8)	−9.6 (14.7)	−13.1 (8.4)	−20.4 (−4.7)	−30.0 (−22.0)
Average precipitation mm (inches)	39.4 (1.55)	29.0 (1.14)	39.5 (1.56)	27.7 (1.09)	57.1 (2.25)	56.0 (2.20)	72.6 (2.86)	65.5 (2.58)	49.2 (1.94)	38.5 (1.52)	35.1 (1.38)	40.4 (1.59)	549.9 (21.65)
Average extreme snow depth cm (inches)	4.7 (1.9)	4.8 (1.9)	2.9 (1.1)	0.7 (0.3)	0.0 (0.0)	0.0 (0.0)	0.0 (0.0)	0.0 (0.0)	0.0 (0.0)	0.1 (0.0)	1.4 (0.6)	4.1 (1.6)	4.8 (1.9)
Average precipitation days (≥ 0.1 mm)	19.00	15.17	14.50	11.67	13.47	13.50	13.87	13.57	12.77	15.00	17.20	18.93	178.63
Average snowy days (≥ 0 cm)	13.1	11.7	5.0	0.4	0.0	0.0	0.0	0.0	0.0	trace	2.8	7.5	40.5
Average relative humidity (%)	88.8	84.7	77.9	68.4	68.2	69.0	70.1	72.5	79.5	84.9	90.9	90.7	78.8
Mean monthly sunshine hours	45.1	68.8	127.7	205.0	255.7	252.4	259.2	240.2	164.6	108.0	46.0	32.7	1,805.4
Source 1: Institute of Meteorology and Water Management
Source 2: Meteomodel.pl (records, relative humidity 1991–2020)
