= Gmina Gostycyn =

Gmina Gostycyn Gostycyn Commune
- Gmina
- Coat of arms
- Interactive map of Gmina Gostycyn
- Coordinates (Gostycyn): 53°29′21″N 17°48′36″E
- Country: Poland
- Voivodeship: Kuyavian-Pomeranian
- County: Tuchola
- Seat: Gostycyn

Area
  - Total: 136.15 km^{2} (52.57 sq mi)

Population (2006)
  - Total: 5,189
  - Density: 38.11/km^{2} (98.71/sq mi)
- Website: http://www.gostycyn.las.pl/

Gmina Gostycyn is a rural gmina (administrative district) in Tuchola County, Kuyavian-Pomeranian Voivodeship, in north-central Poland. Its seat is the village of Gostycyn, which lies approximately 13 kilometres (8 mi) south of Tuchola and 44 km (27 mi) north of Bydgoszcz.

The gmina covers an area of 136.15 square kilometres (52.6 sq mi), and as of 2006 its total population is 5,189.

The gmina contains part of the protected area called Tuchola Landscape Park.

== Villages ==
Gmina Gostycyn contains the villages and settlements of Bagienica, Gostycyn, Kamienica, Łyskowo, Mała Klonia, Motyl, Piła, Pruszcz, Przyrowa, Świt, Wielka Klonia, Wielki Mędromierz and Żółwiniec.

== Neighbouring gminas ==
Gmina Gostycyn is bordered by the gminas of Cekcyn, Kęsowo, Koronowo, Lubiewo, Sępólno Krajeńskie, Sośno and Tuchola.
