= Pruszcz, Tuchola County =

Pruszcz
- Village
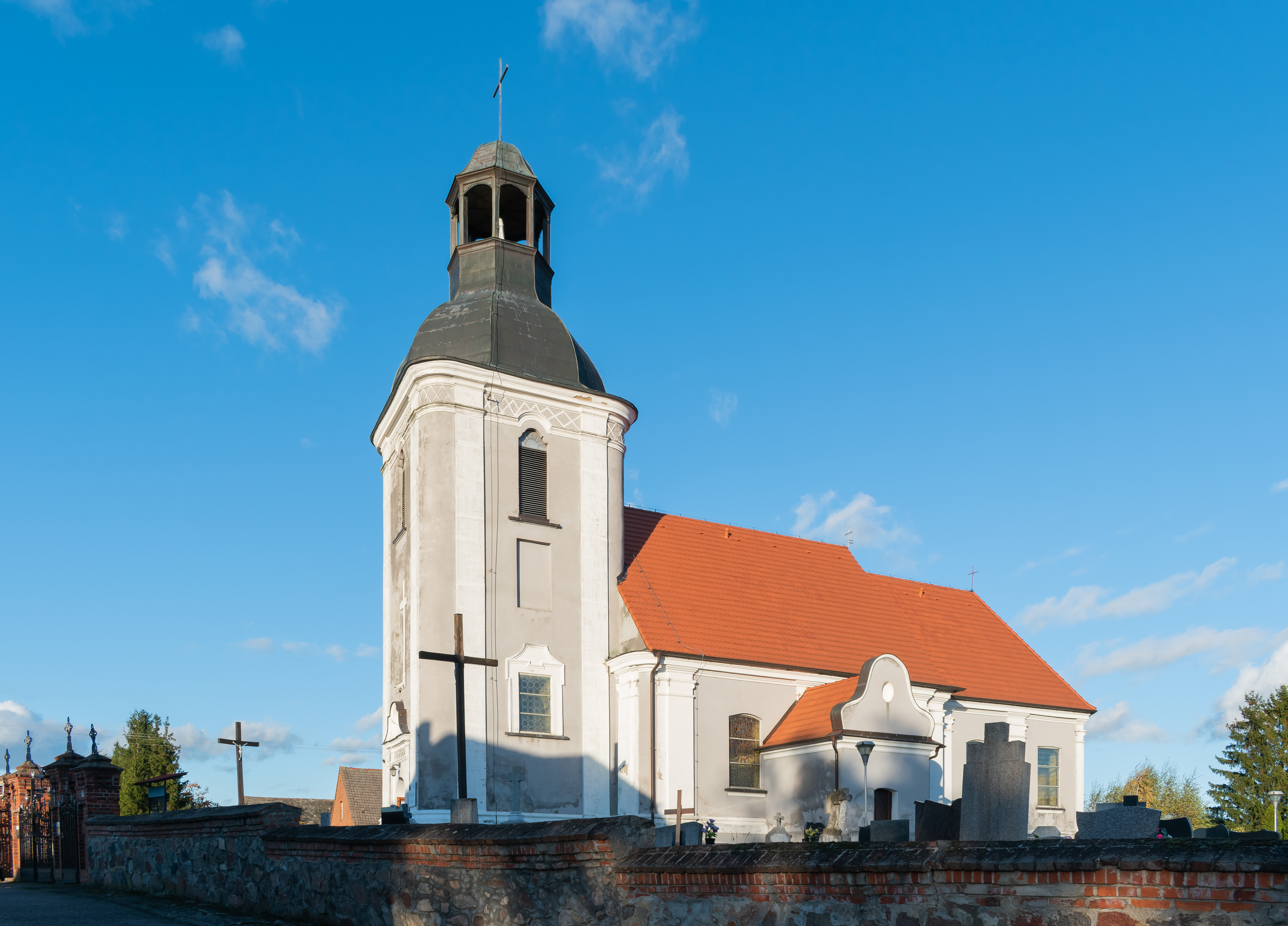
- Parish church from 1762

- Location within Poland
- Coordinates: 53°26′56″N 17°49′39″E
- Country: Poland
- Voivodeship: Kuyavian-Pomeranian
- County: Tuchola
- Gmina: Gostycyn

Population
  - Total: 870
- Time zone: UTC+1 (CET)
  - Summer (DST): UTC+2 (CEST)
- Vehicle registration: CTU

Pruszcz [pruʂt͡ʂ] is a village in the administrative district of Gmina Gostycyn, within Tuchola County, Kuyavian-Pomeranian Voivodeship, in north-central Poland.

== History ==
The existence of the village is documented in 1351. The Baroque Church of the Nativity of the Virgin Mary was built in 1762. In 1867, the village had a population of 463.

Pruszcz was the site of a minor battle during the German invasion of Poland, which started World War II in September 1939. On September 1, 1939, the German 3rd Panzer Division, part of General Heinz Guderian's XIX Army Corps, advanced through the village seeking to capture a railway bridge over the Brda River 3 km to the east. Around 09:15 the lead German units encountered elements of the Polish 9th Infantry Division's 34th Infantry Regiment. In the two hour battle that followed the Polish troops succeeded in destroying a Panzer IV medium tank using a 37mm anti-tank gun, while 22 Polish infantrymen were killed in the action. The skirmish bought time for Polish troops to partially burn the bridge over the Brda, delaying the German advance for several hours. During the subsequent German occupation, in 1941–1942 and 1944, the occupiers carried out expulsions of Poles, whose houses and farms houses were handed over to German colonists as part of the Lebensraum policy. Expelled Poles were either enslaved as forced labour of German colonists or deported to the Potulice concentration camp.
