= Kamienica, Tuchola County =

Kamienica
- Village
- Location within Poland
- Coordinates: 53°28′46″N 17°48′31″E
- Country: Poland
- Voivodeship: Kuyavian-Pomeranian
- County: Tuchola
- Gmina: Gostycyn
- Population: 640

Kamienica [kamjɛˈnit͡sa] is a village in the administrative district of Gmina Gostycyn, within Tuchola County, Kuyavian-Pomeranian Voivodeship, in north-central Poland.
