= Staszica and Paderewskiego Streets, Bydgoszcz =

Coordinates: 53°07′50″N 18°00′48″E

Staszica and Paderewskiego streets
Bydgoszcz
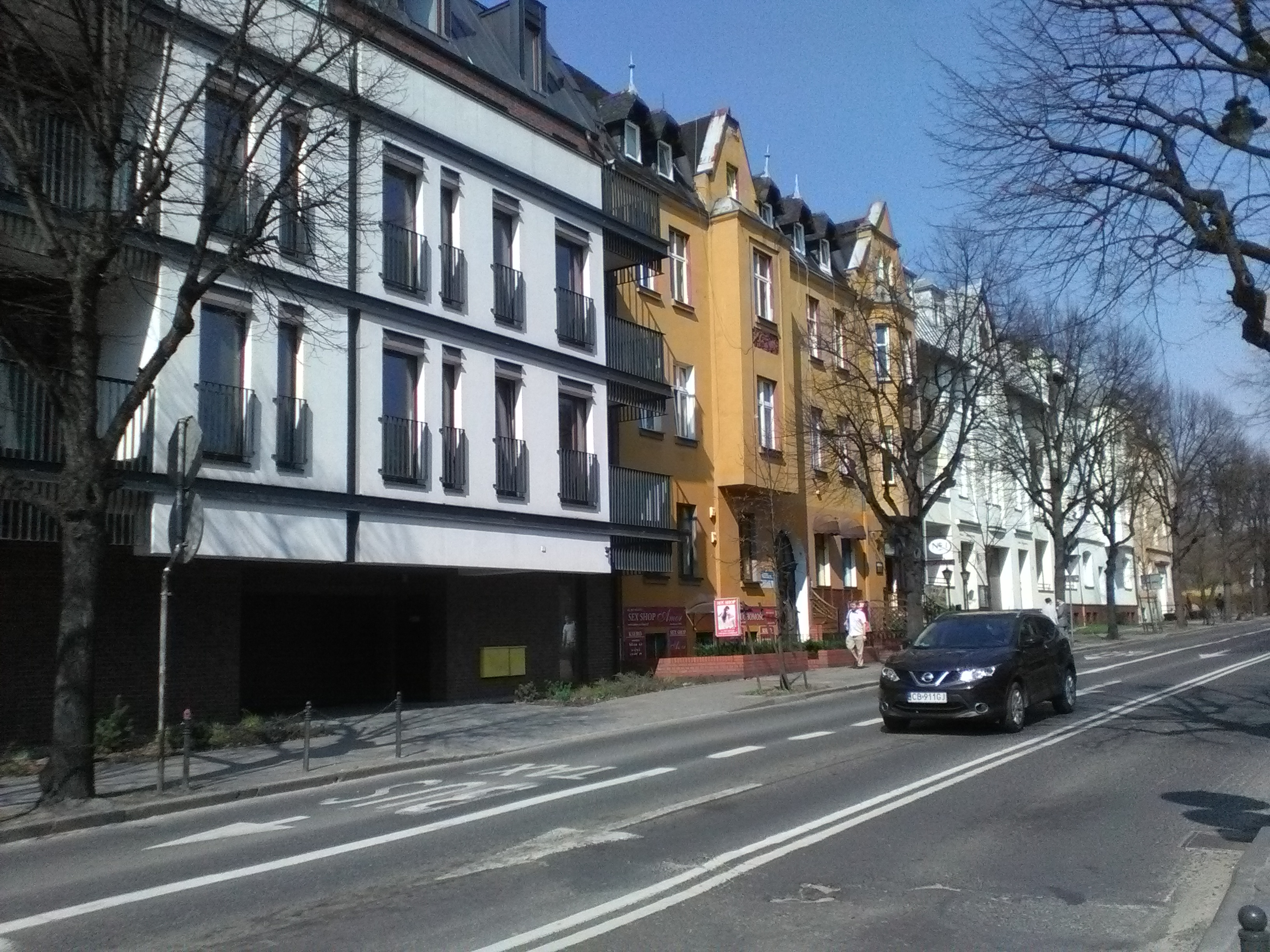
- View of Staszica street facades

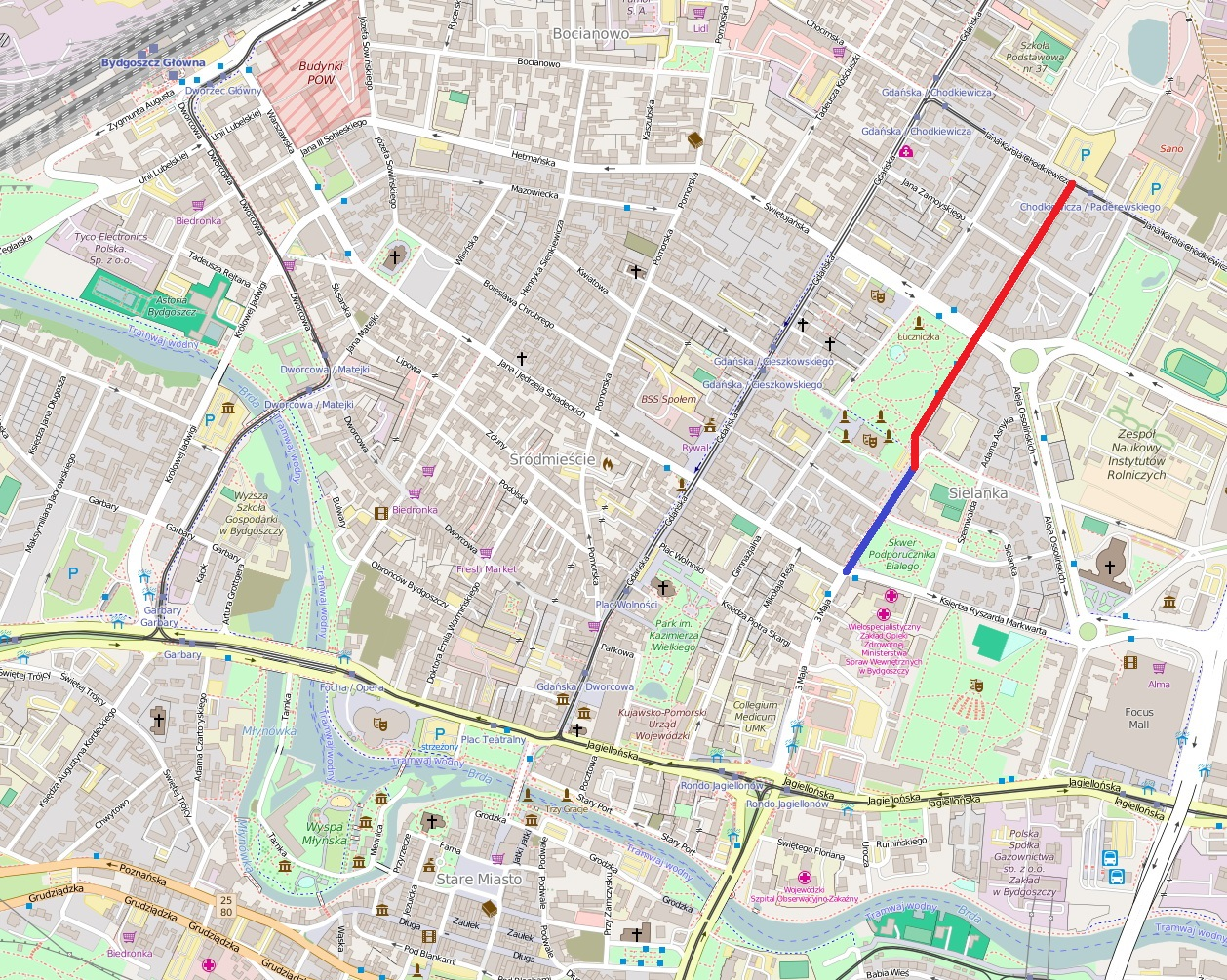
- Staszica (blue line) and Paderewskiego (red line) streets
- Native name: Ulicy Staszica i Paderewskiego (Polish)
- Former names: Braesicke and Schiller Straßen
- Namesake: Stanisław Staszic and Ignacy Jan Paderewski
- Owner: City of Bydgoszcz
- Length: 800 m (2,600 ft)Google maps 220m (Staczica) and 580m (Paderewskiego)
- Width: c. 10m
- Area: Downtown district
- Location: Bydgoszcz, Poland

Construction
- Construction start: Beginning of the 20th century
- Completed: Before 1908

Staszica and Paderewskiego streets are located in downtown district, in Bydgoszcz, Poland. Many of the buildings along this axis are either registered on the Kuyavian–Pomeranian Voivodeship heritage list, or part of a historical ensemble of Eclectic and Art Nouveau architecture in Bydgoszcz.

== Location ==
Streets stretch on a continuous axis, roughly south–north oriented, running parallel to Gdańska and 20 Stycznia 1920 streets on the west.

Staszica street, is 220 metres (720 ft) long, from the crossing with Krasiński Street to the southern tip of Paderewskiego street.

Paderewskiego street, 580 metres (1,900 ft) long, extends to the north Staszica till reaching the intersection with Chodkiewicza street.

== History ==
On an 1876 map by Paul Berthold Jaekel, the pathway is indicated, without any mention of the name. The first map to reference both streets dates back to 1908, under the following calling: Braesicke Straße and Schiller Straße.

In Bromberg address books, both axis are listed from 1905 onwards. During several decades, Staszica street has been part of a longer path, incorporated to now 3 Maja street:

- till 1860s, this longer track was known as Grostwo (estate), then Hempel estate;
- identically, from 1914 to 1926, 3 Maja (then Hempel straße) and Staszica (then Braesicke straße) streets were merged under the calling Hempel straße and Ulica Grodztwo.

Paderewskiego street inception was part of a district developed in two plans, one at the end of the 19th century, another in 1903. The concept of this new area was based on a rectangular grid of streets (Gdańska, Adam Mickiewicz Alley, Józef Weyssenhoff Square, Niemcewicza and Chodkiewicza), all located within city boundaries. This district was also convenient by the proximity of the newly built facilities (administrative and educational center), main railway station.

By 2023, Paderewskiego street will be extended to the north by 180 metres (590 ft) to join the future Music Academy Campus which is planned stand on a three-hectare plot, between streets Kamienna, Chodkiewicza and Gdańska

=== Naming ===
Staszica street was known as Braesicke Straße, from its construction to 1920 and during German occupation (1939–1945). Mr Braesicke was a mayor of Bromberg from 1890 to 1898.

Current name comes from Stanisław Staszic (1755–1826), a leading figure of the Polish Enlightenment: a Catholic priest, philosopher, geologist, writer, poet, translator and statesman.

Paderewskiego street was called Schiller Straße, from its inception till 1920, and also during German occupation, with reference to German poet Friedrich Schiller.

Patron name refers to Ignacy Jan Paderewski (1860–1941), a Polish pianist and composer, politician, statesman and spokesman for Polish independence.

== Main edifices ==
=== Staszica Street ===
The street, on its first numbers, faces on the east a large green area, Lieutenant Leszek Biały square.

Tenement at Zygmunt Krasiński Street 23, corner with Staszica street

2010, by Budlex

Modern architecture

The plot at then Fröhnerstraße 3 was first owned by Robert Böhme, also landlord of tenement at Nr.21. At the end of World War I, the area has been left abandoned until a first theatre, Paw, was built. It opened on Sunday 8 November 1929 with an 800-seat capacity. It became cinema Appolo in 1931. During World War II, Nazi authorities changed its name to Bidegast. The theatre was renamed Polonia in 1945: it welcomed movies till 31 March 2003.

Once demolished, the place has been housing a new habitation complex, Rubinowy Dom (Ruby House), since 2010.

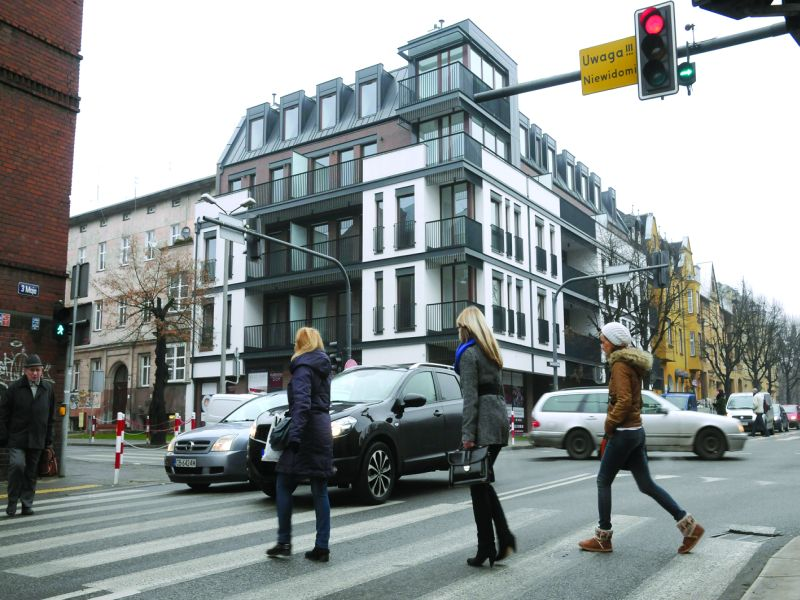
Corner view

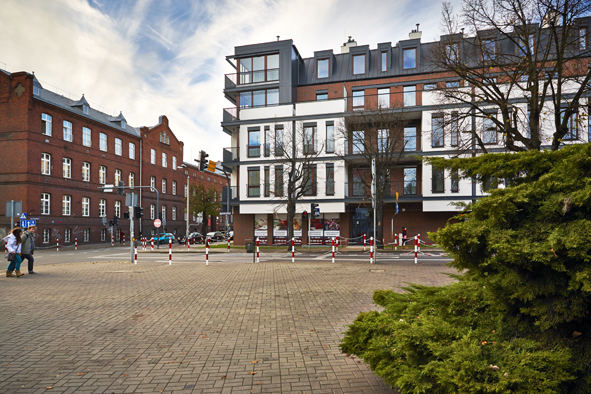
View from the square

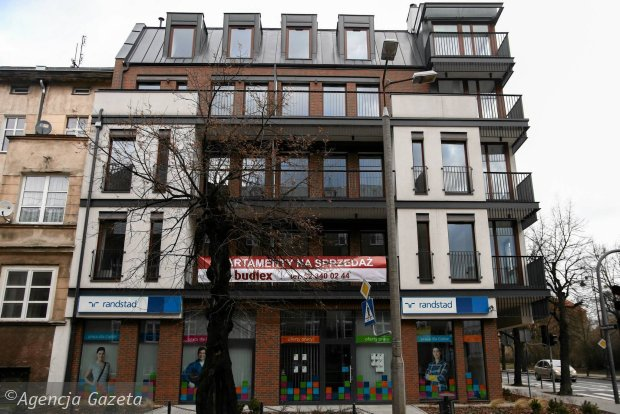
Facade on Krasińskiego street

Tenement at 1

1902–1903

Eclecticism

At its construction, the address was Braesicke Straße 2: house landlord was Albert Sawallich, first evangelical sexton.

Stripped from many original details but a facade cartouche, the elevation still display two bay windows, and a series of dormers topped by finials. Access to the building is allowed through two large decorated wooden doors with transom lights.

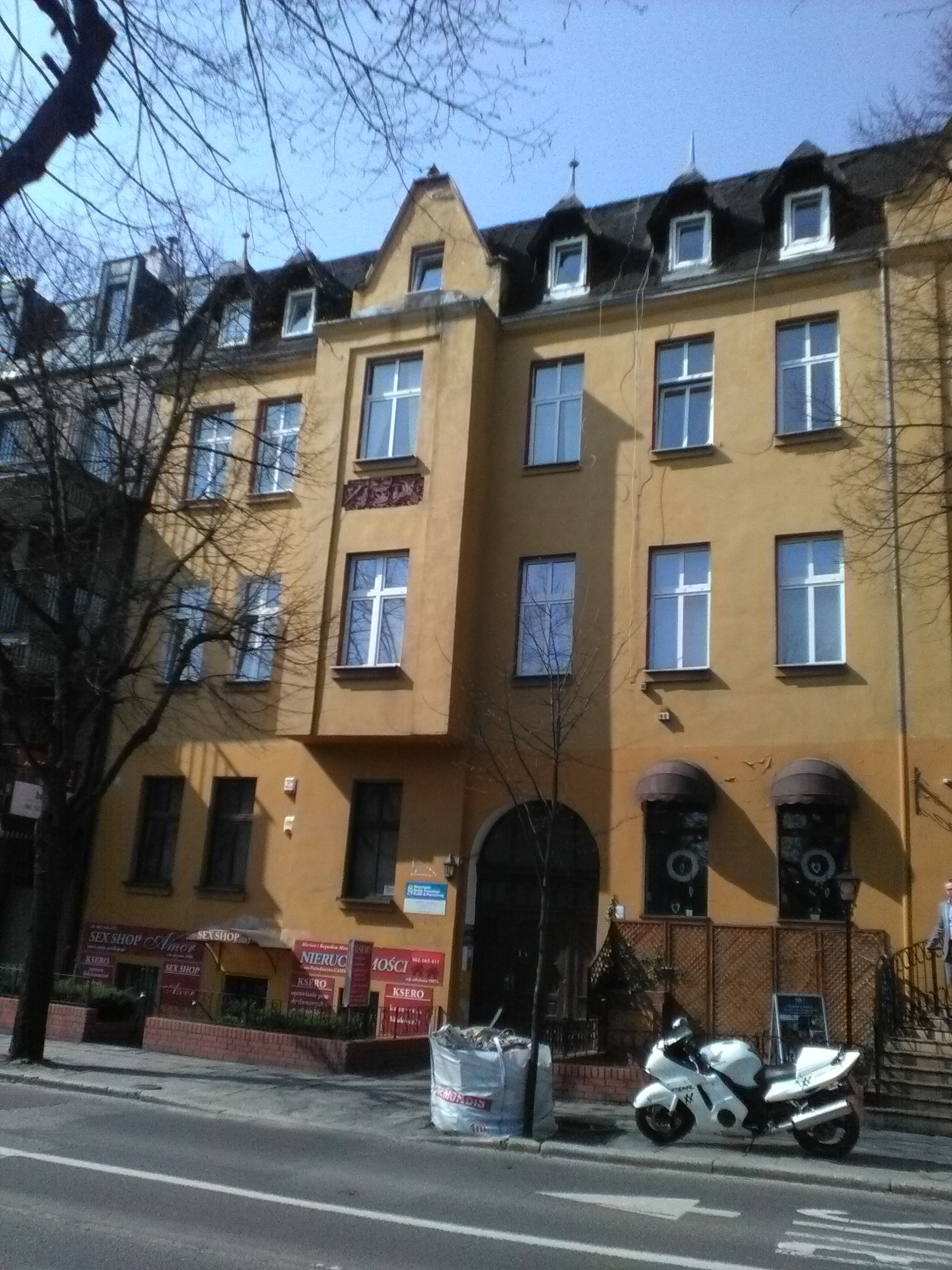
Main elevation on the street

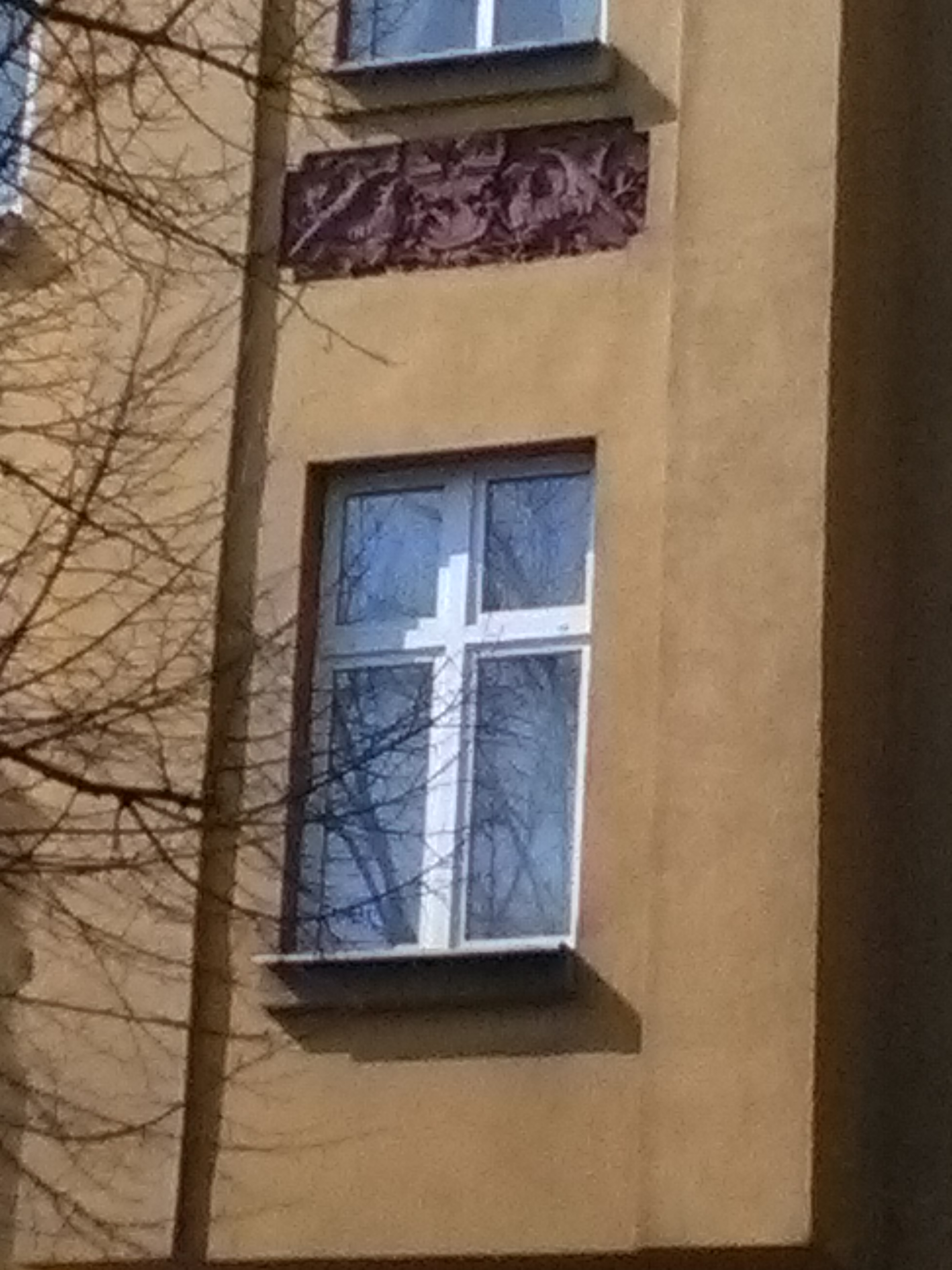
Detail of the cartouche

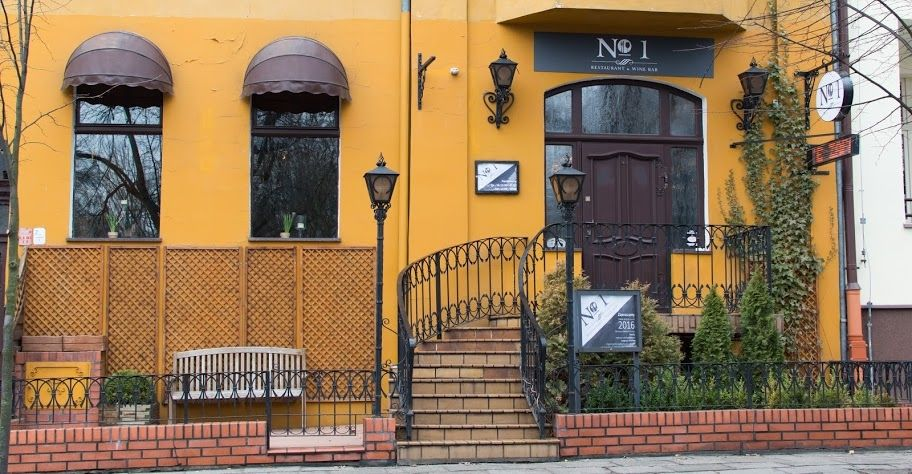
Gate of the restaurant

Lieutenant Leszek Biały square

This green area is what is left from the urban plan developed in the 1910s by German architect Josef Stübben and called the Sielanka estate (Idyll). At the time this part of the city had not been touched by urban growth, as Gdańska or Dworcowa streets could have been at the end of the 19th century. Sielanka district never included this square as it was a property of Province of Posen (German: Provinz Posen) and not owned by the municipality. After the rebirth of Poland in 1918, the area was declared to be constructed, but no project was ever completed. In the 1960s, a memorial has been built up to celebrate the Millennium of the Polish State (Polish: Pomnik Tysiąclecia Państwa Polskiego). Designed by Polish artist Stanislaw Lejkowski, it was unveiled on 22 July 1967. However, the entire scheme was never achieved: the nest in the tripod was supposed to be crowned with the Piast eagle, which was considered by the communist authorities to be too similar to the symbols used during WWII by the Polish Armed Forces in the West. In 2011, the city had even projects to demolish it, but it turned out to be very expensive.

The site has been given the name Lt. Leszek Biały in November 2013. Leszek Biały was a hero of the Home Army during the Second World War. His father Ludwik lived at 1 Sielanka Street. Under the code name Jakub, he was arrested in February 1945 by members of soviet controlled Ministry of Public Security and was murdered during interrogations on 3 March 1945.

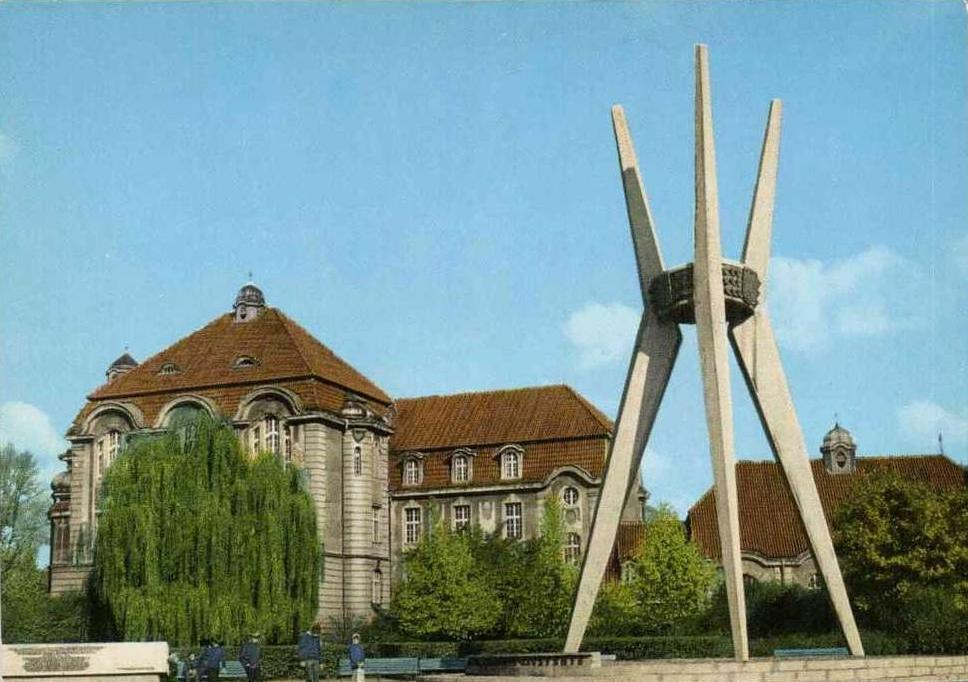
The square and its monument c. 1975

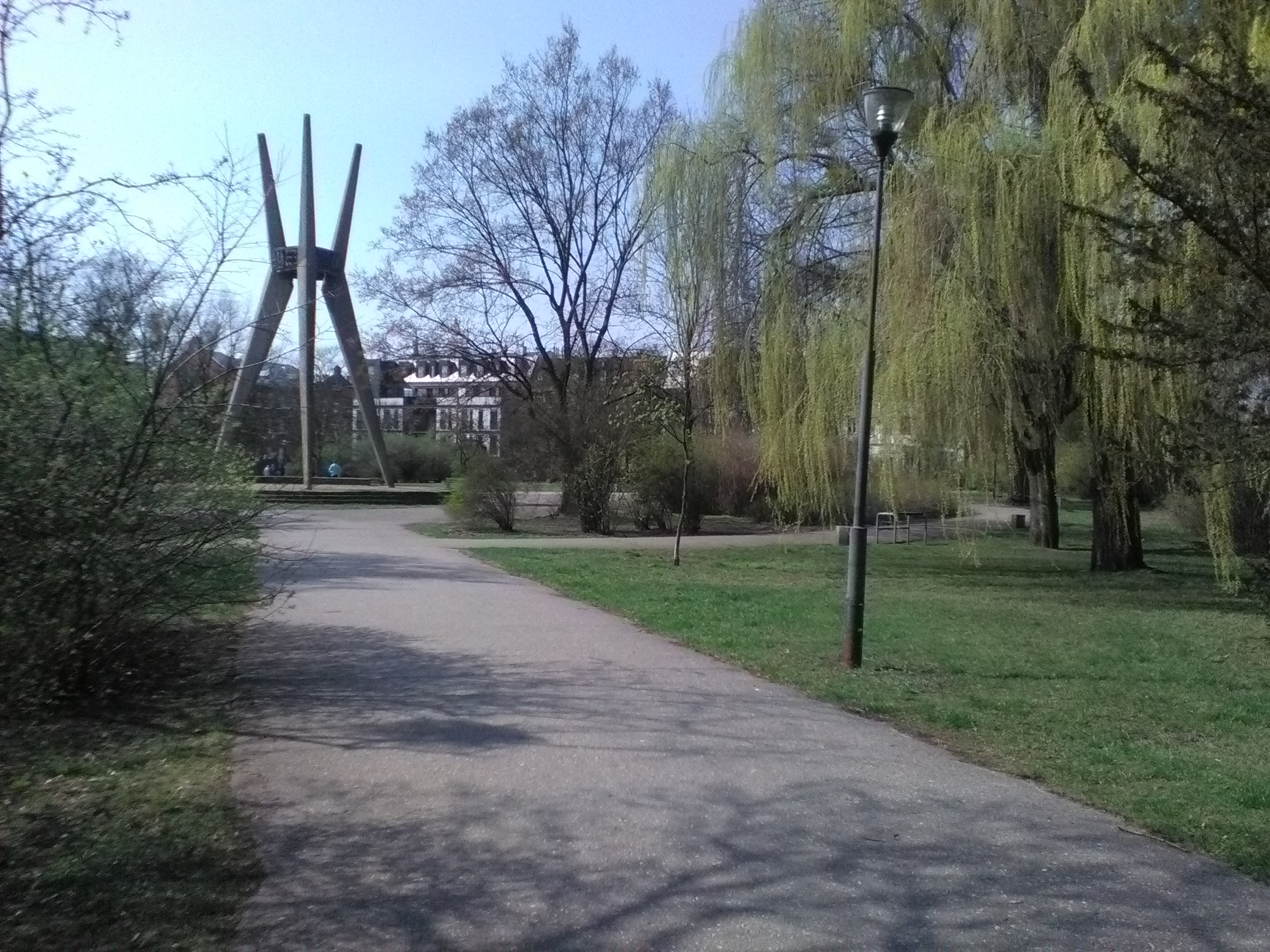
The square from the street

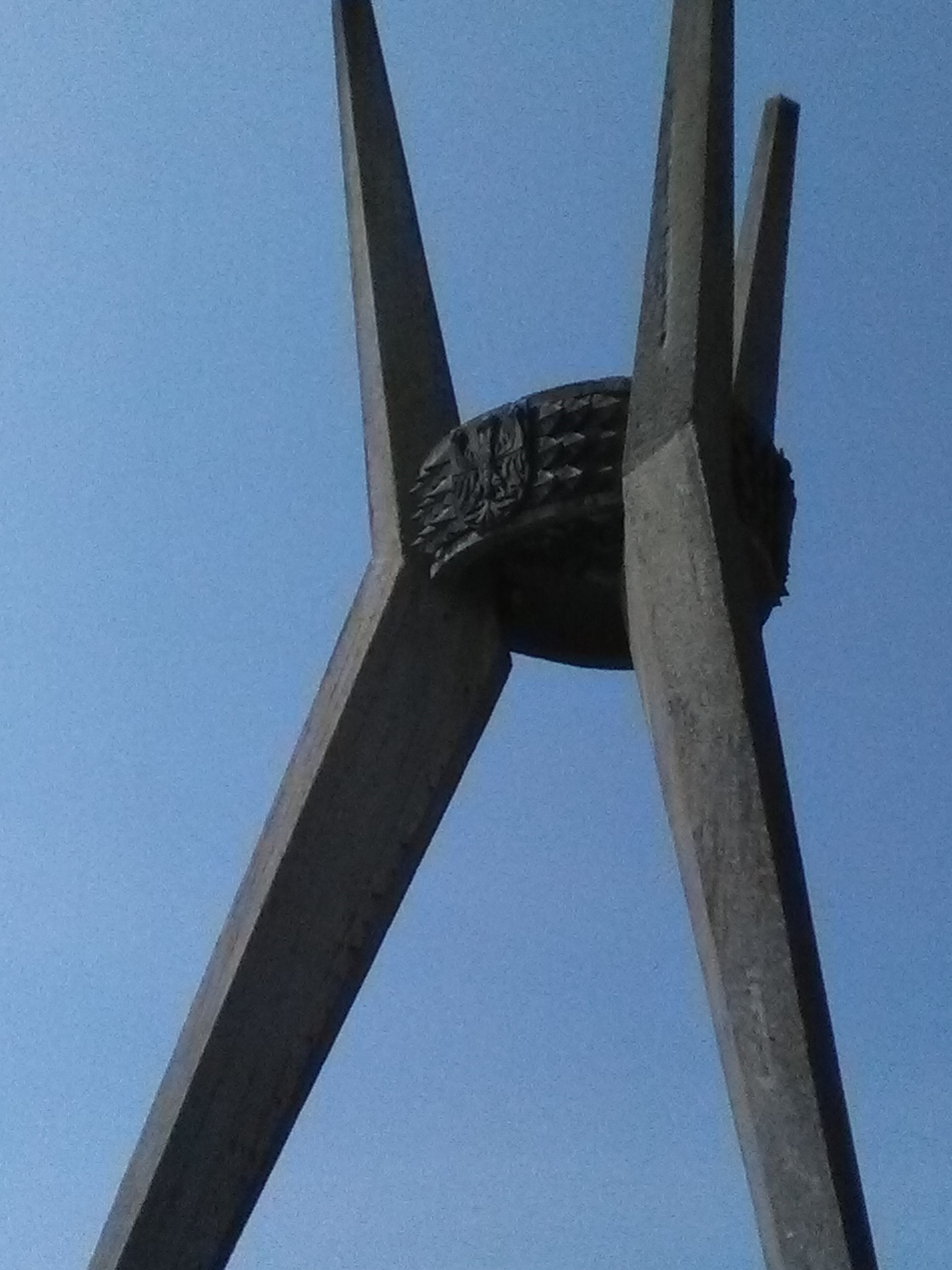
The unachieved monument to the Millennium of the Polish State

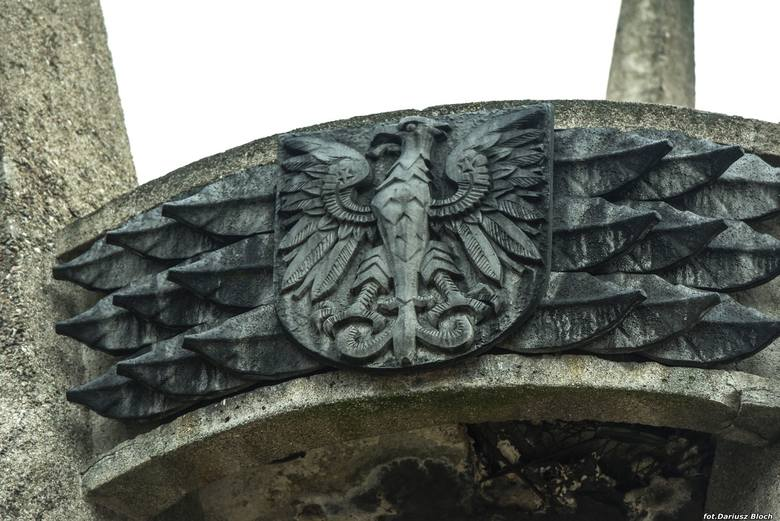
Detail of the crown

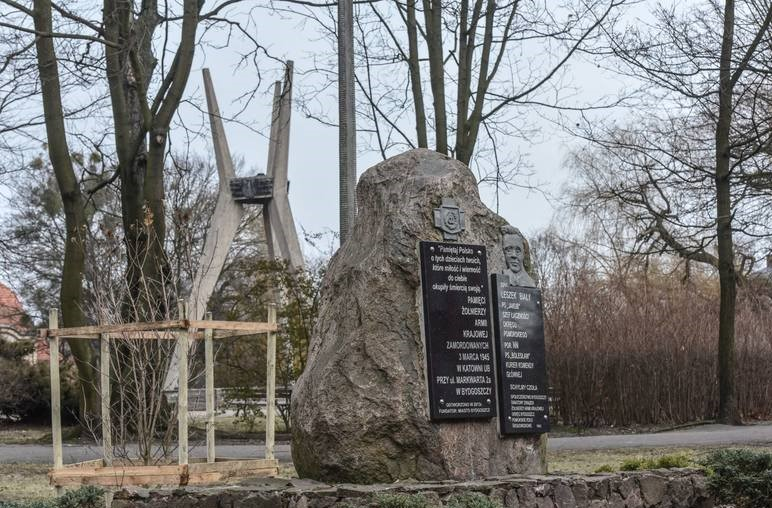
Memorial stone and plaque to Leszek Biały

Tenement at 3

1903–1904, by Fritz Weidner

Eclecticism, elements of Historicism and Art Nouveau

The construction of this tenement, at then Braesicke Straße 3, was funded by Prussian city authorities and dedicated for renting (German: Wohnungsverein zu Bromberg). It housed up to 8 families. After 1918, the building kept its role as city rental flats, under Polish direction. Today, it is part of the network of lodgings offered to Music school students in Bydgoszcz, together with neighbouring building at Nr.7 (at the corner with Kołłątaja street). In the backyard is located an auditorium with 100 seats (Polish: Sala Koncertowa).

The building displays a symmetric array of loggias, on both sides of a slight round bay window topped with a wattle and daub gable. There is a wood-and glass gate to the concert hall with a transom light.

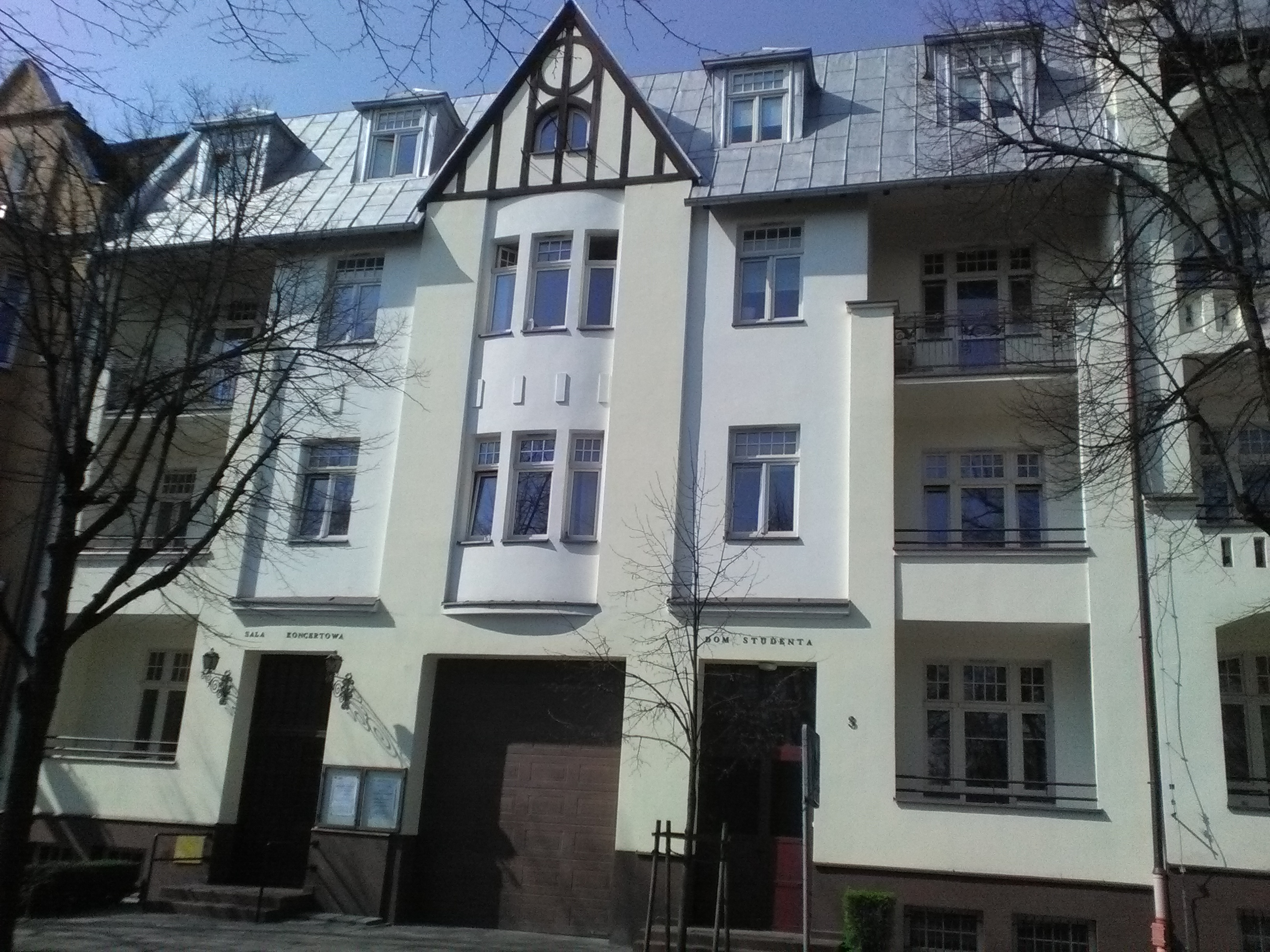
View from the street

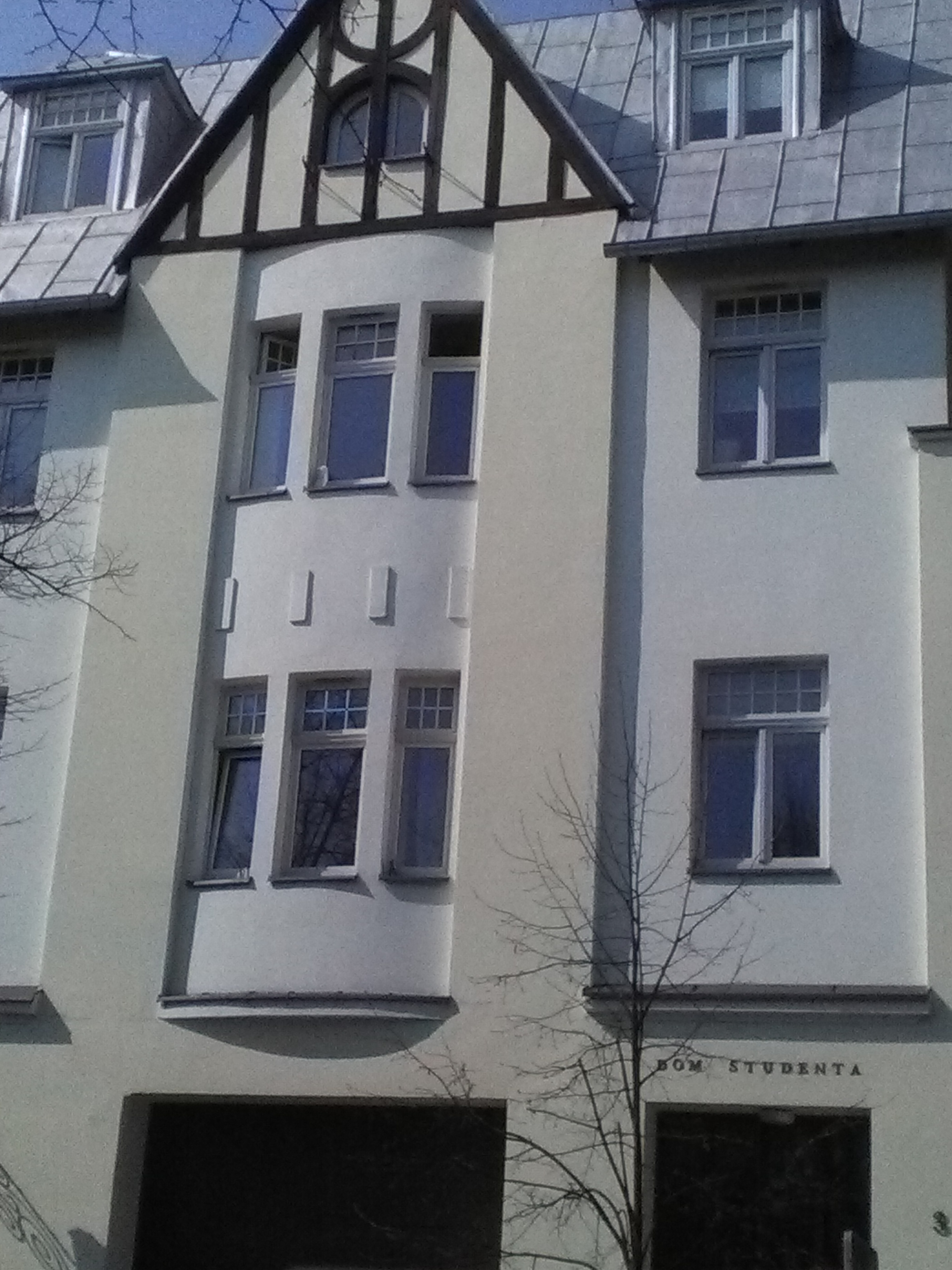
Bay window

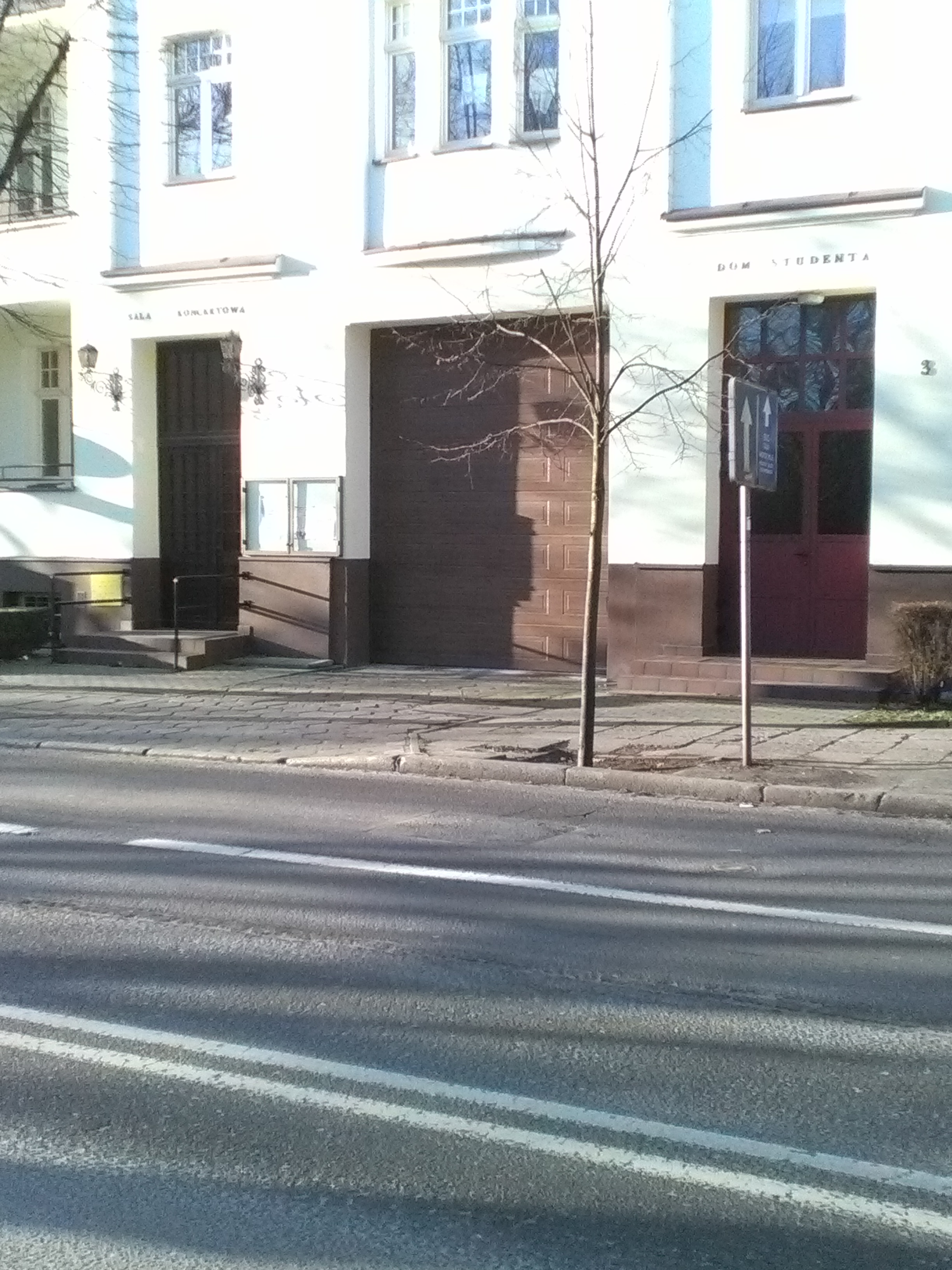
Detail of the entry gates (students rooms and concert hall)

High School Nr.6, at 4

Registered on the Kuyavian-Pomeranian Heritage list Nr.601432, reg. A/989, 28 May 1991

1910

Eclecticism style

The building houses a Polish high school. The institution is in the vicinity of Ignacy Jan Paderewski Pomeranian Philharmonic building, Bydgoszcz Music Academy - "Feliks Nowowiejski" and the Bydgoszcz Music Schools. No far from High School Nr.6 stand St. Vincent de Paul Basilica and Cyprian Norwid High School Nr.1. The building is registered on the Kuyavian-Pomeranian Voivodeship Heritage List.

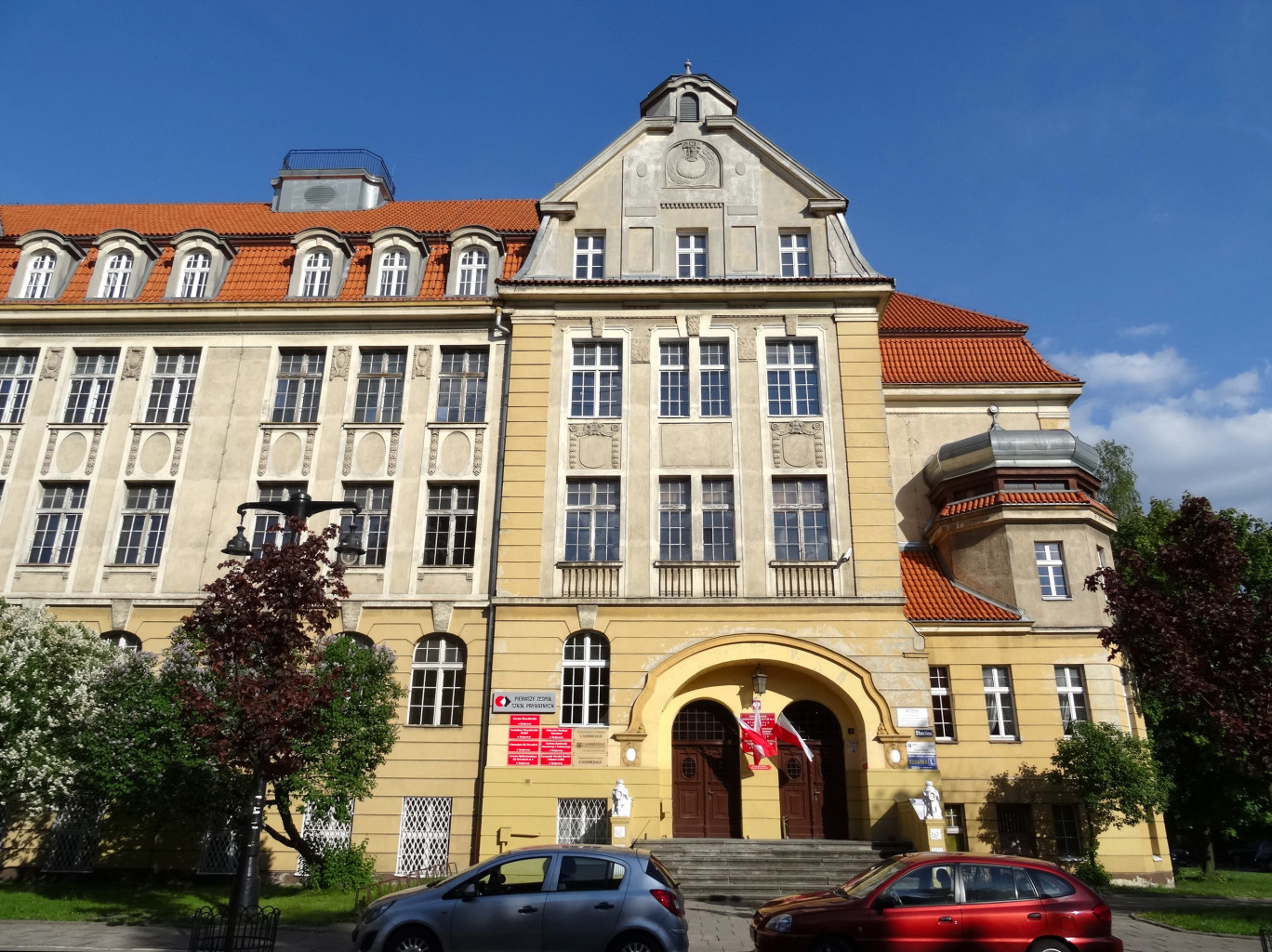
Entry gate

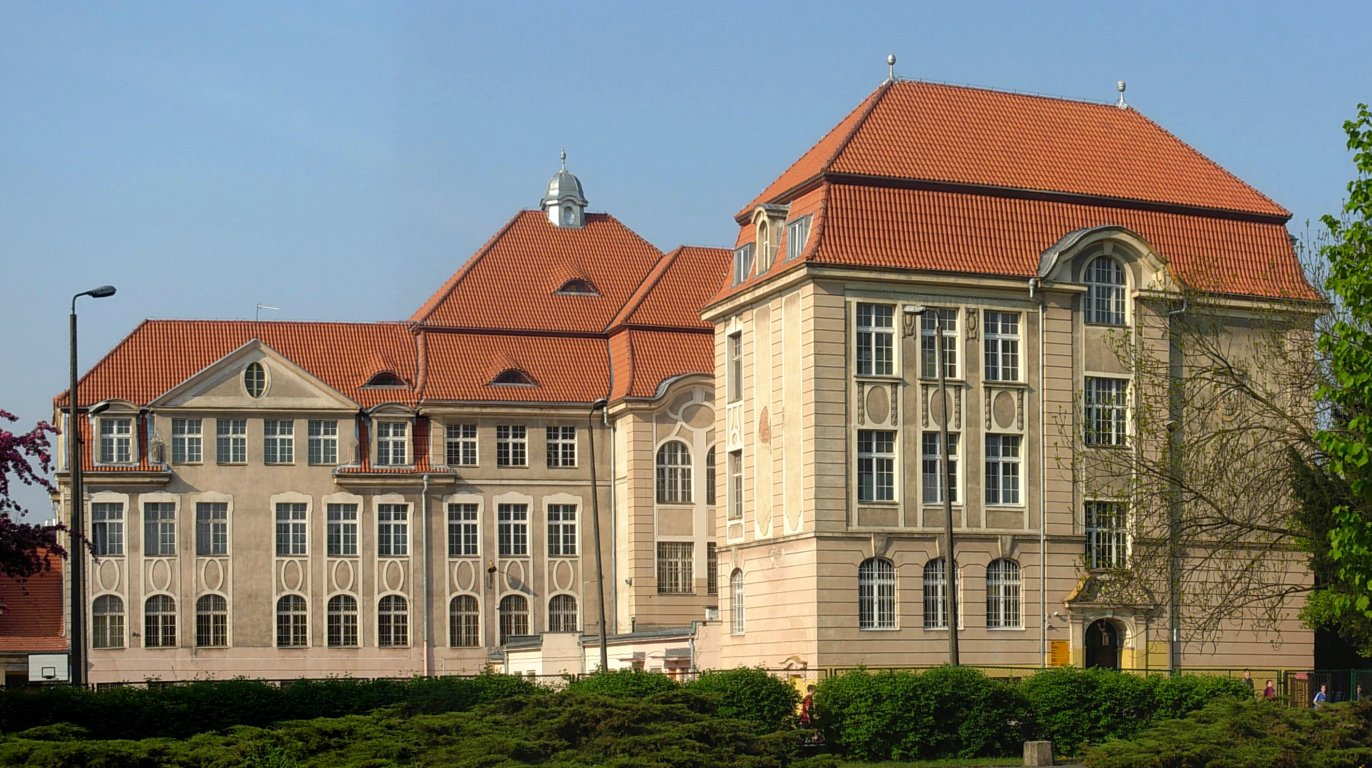
View of eastern facades

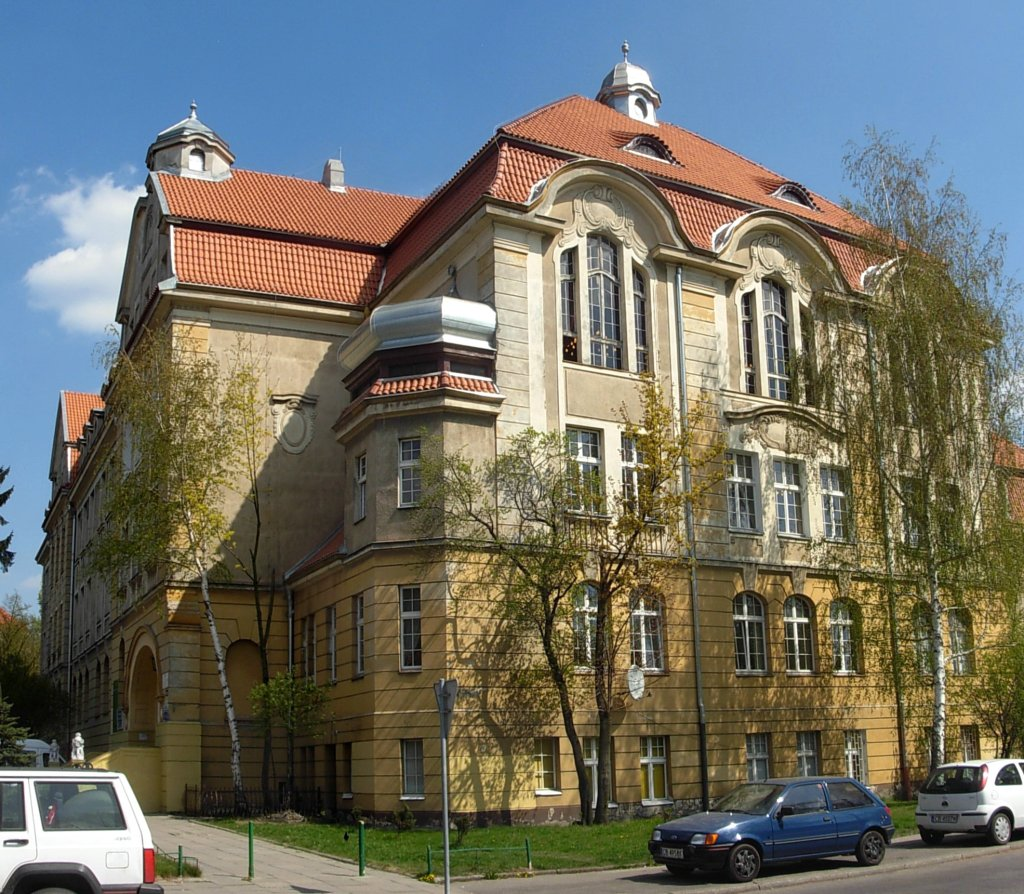
View from Staszica Street

Tenement at 5

1903–1904, by Fritz Weidner

Eclecticism, elements of Historicism and Art Nouveau

Similar to abutting tenements at Nr.3 and 7, Nr.5, at then Braesicke Straße 4, was funded by Prussian city authorities and dedicated for renting (German: Wohnungsverein zu Bromberg), housing up to 6 families. After 1918, the building has been managed under Polish direction, under the calling Bydgoszcz Housing Cooperative (Polish: Bydgoska Spółdzielnia Mieszkaniowa, BSM). In this building lived one of the first sponsor of the BSM project, Teofil Gackowski

The elevation is distinctive from others in the street by the presence of a triangular bay window topped by a tented roof. In addition, loggias show a more original adornment, including arched tops.

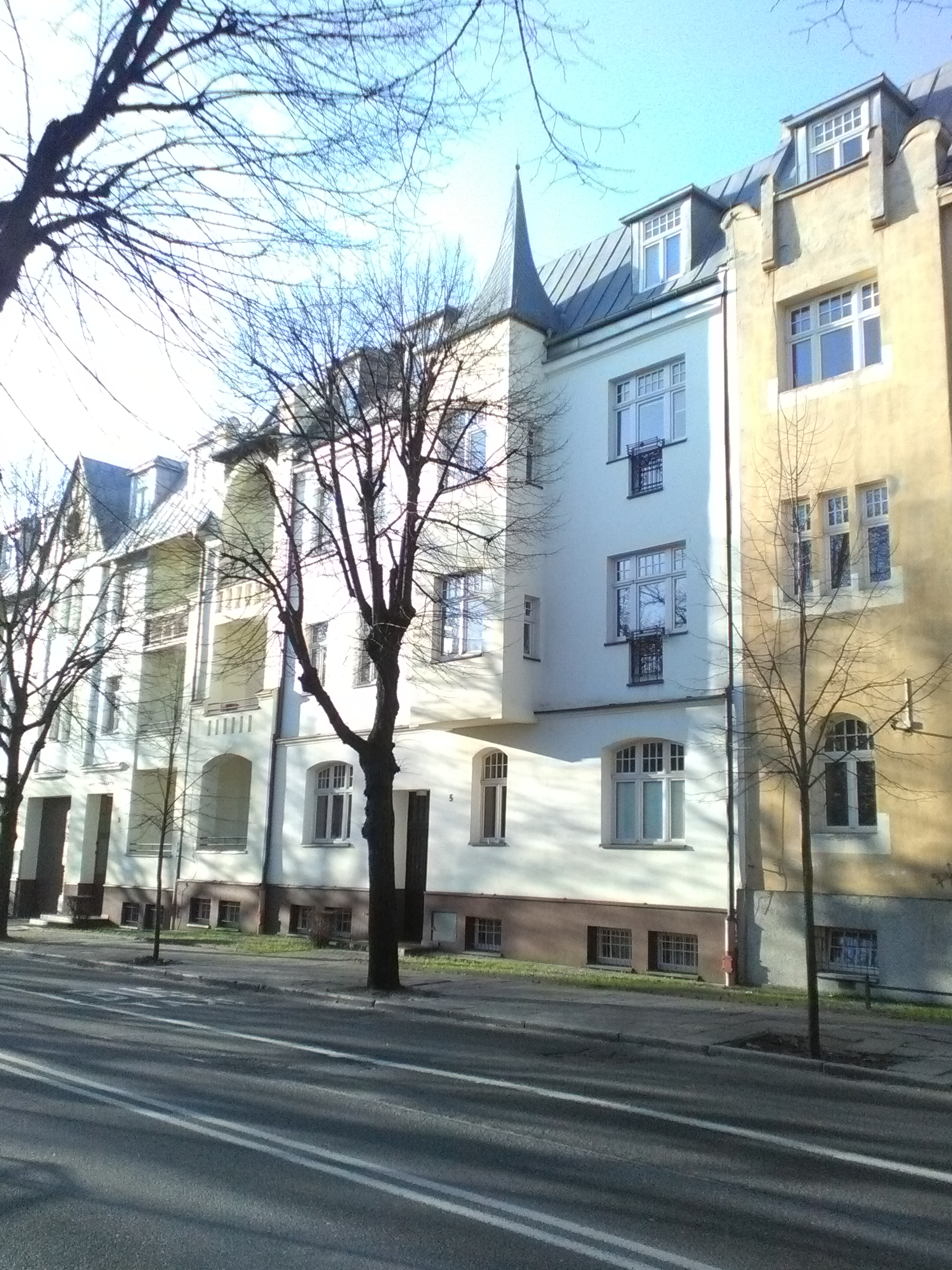
Nr.5 elevation from the street

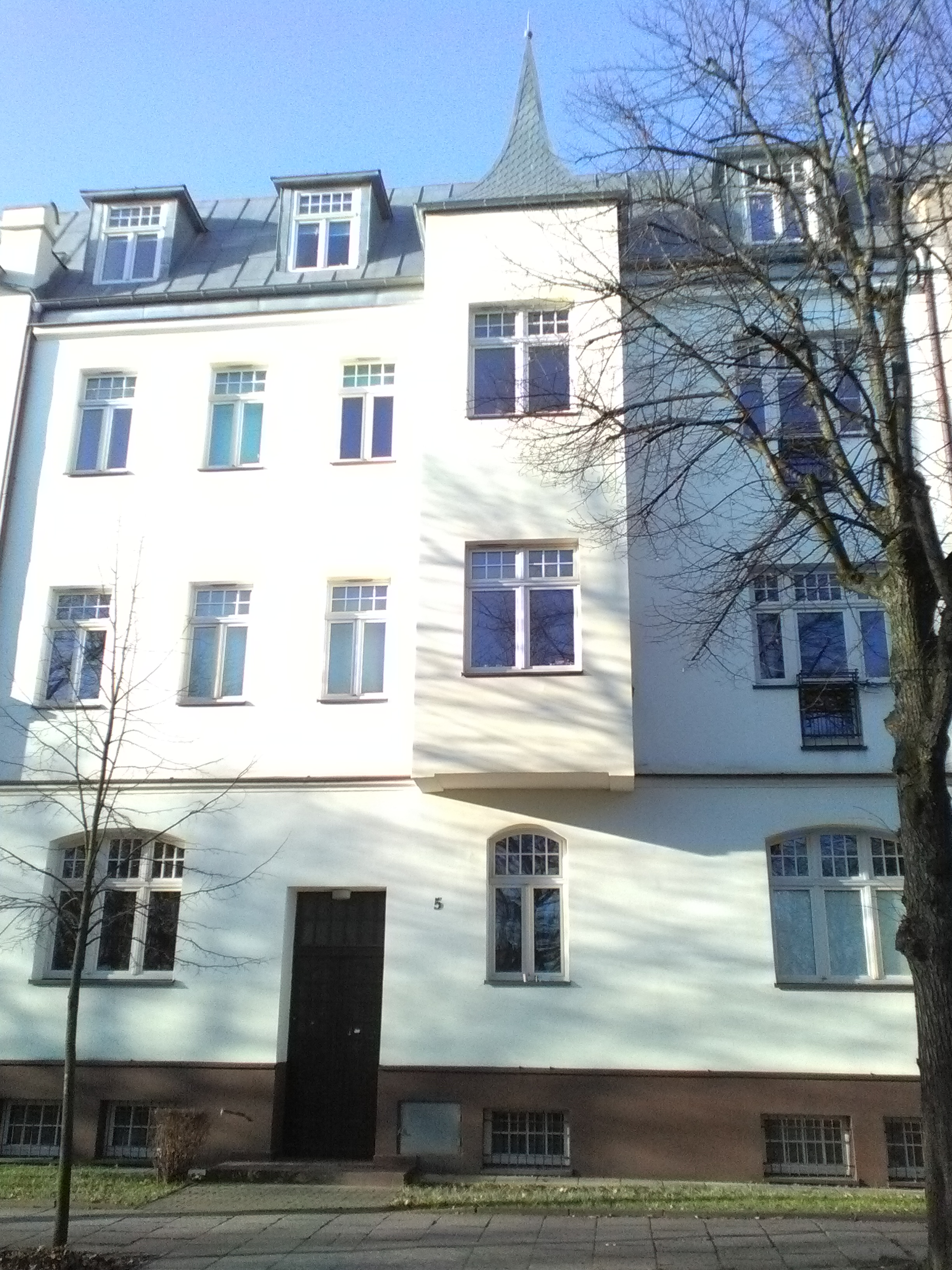
Detail of the bay window

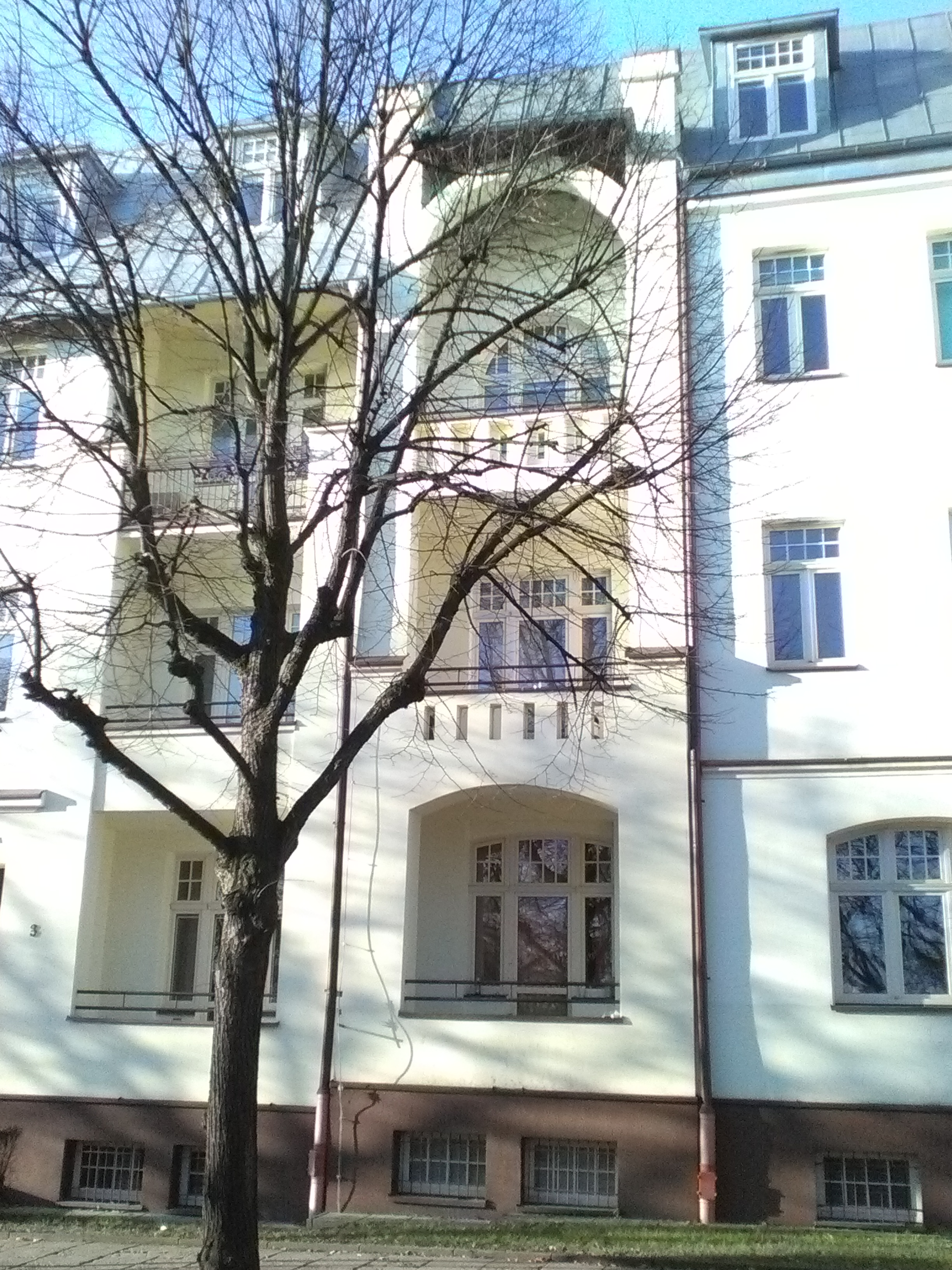
Loggias details

Tenement at 7

1903–1904

Eclecticism

Initial address was Braesicke straße 5: the tenement was owned by the municipality, under the name "City apartment association" (German: Wohnungsverein Gehörig) After the restoration of Poland in 1920, it changed to its Polish equivalent structure, Polish: Towarzystwo mieszkaniowe. In 1983, it was purchased to the benefit of Bydgoszcz Music Academy - "Feliks Nowowiejski" to house music school departments and lodgings for students. Today, it is part of the network of Bydgoszcz Academy of Music teaching buildings, all located downtown; the tenement includes as well a dormitory. Together with the building at 4 Szwalbego, they offer 90 beds.

The huge building offers sleek facades on both streets. On Kołłątaja street there is a sharp triangular bay window topped by a high oitched tented roof with a finial, and on Staszica street a slight avant-corps topped with curves and simili pilasters. Both sides display a series of shed dormers, as well as entry gates adorned with a large lintel (Staszica street), and lighter one with flower motifs and a woman head (Kołłątaja side).

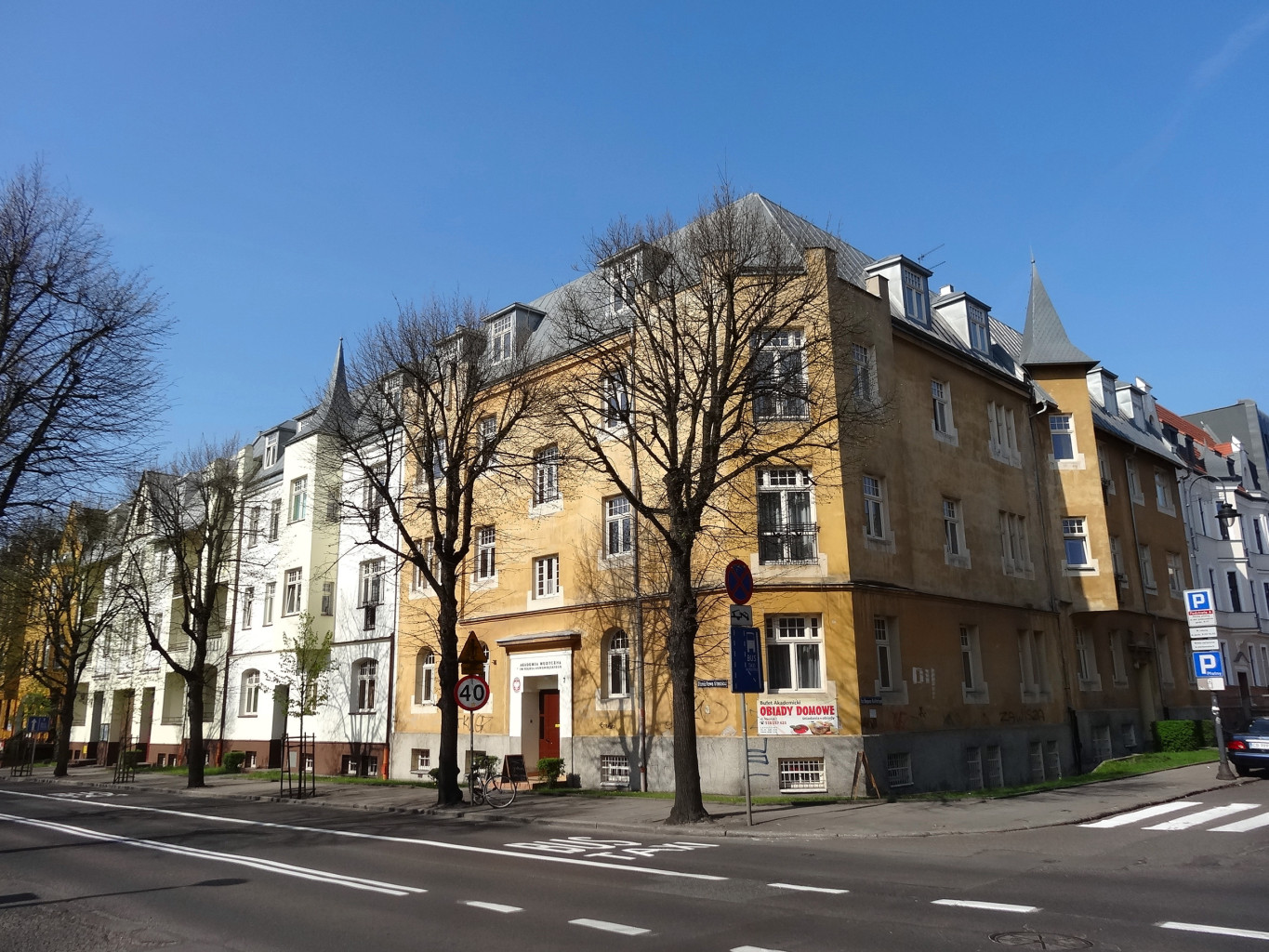
View of the building at 7 Staszica street

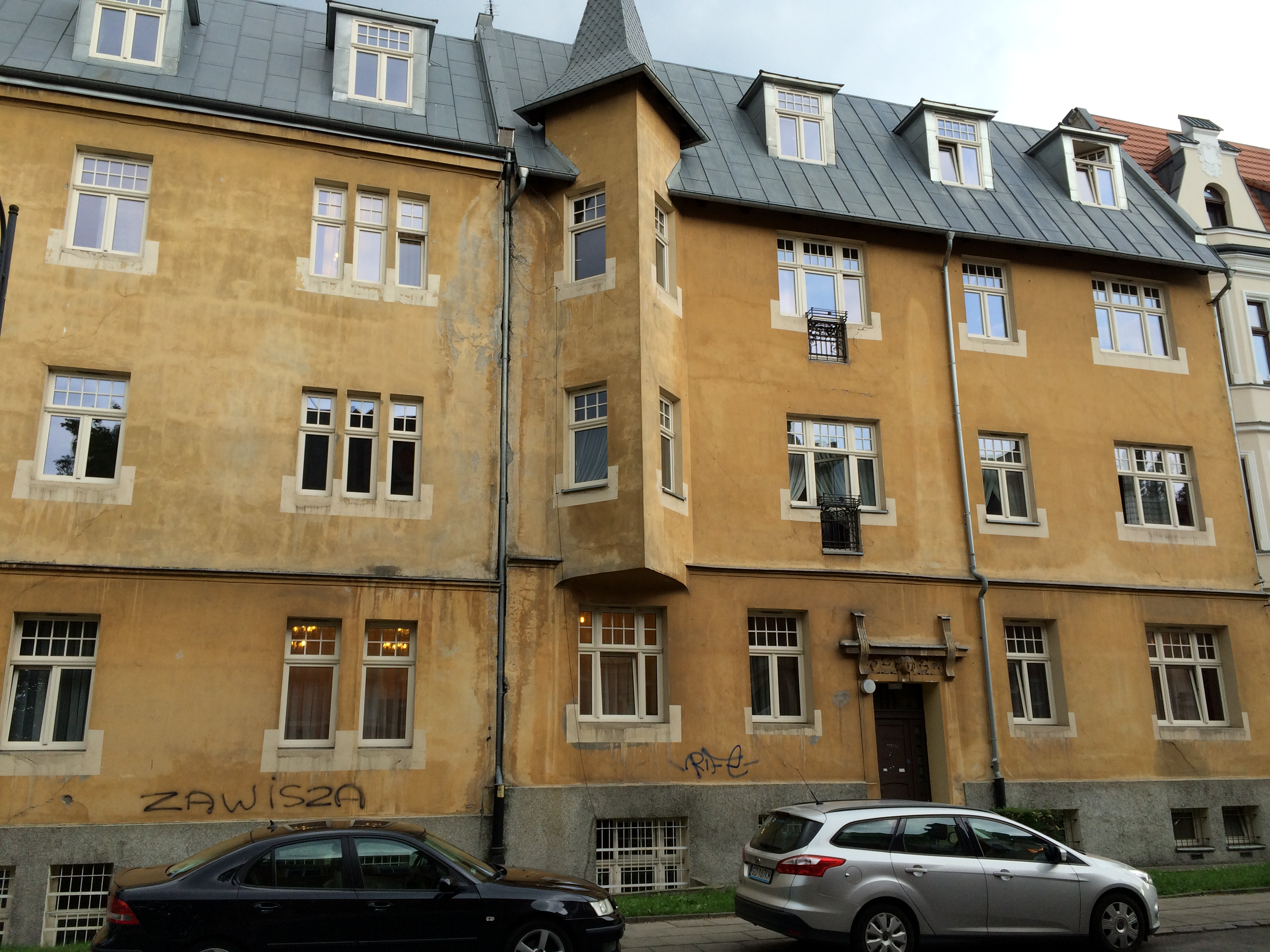
Facade on Kołłątaja street

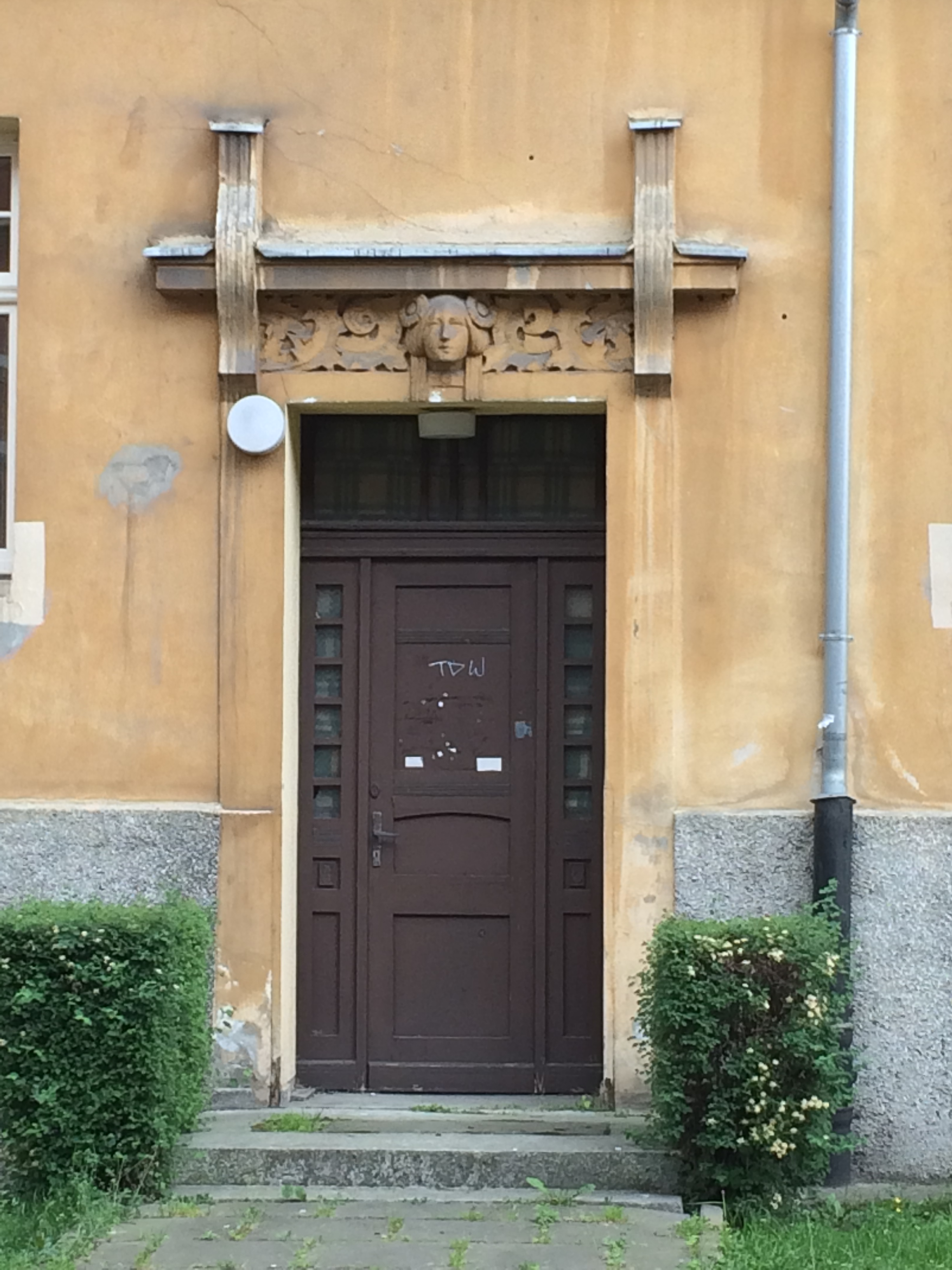
Gate on Kołłątaja street

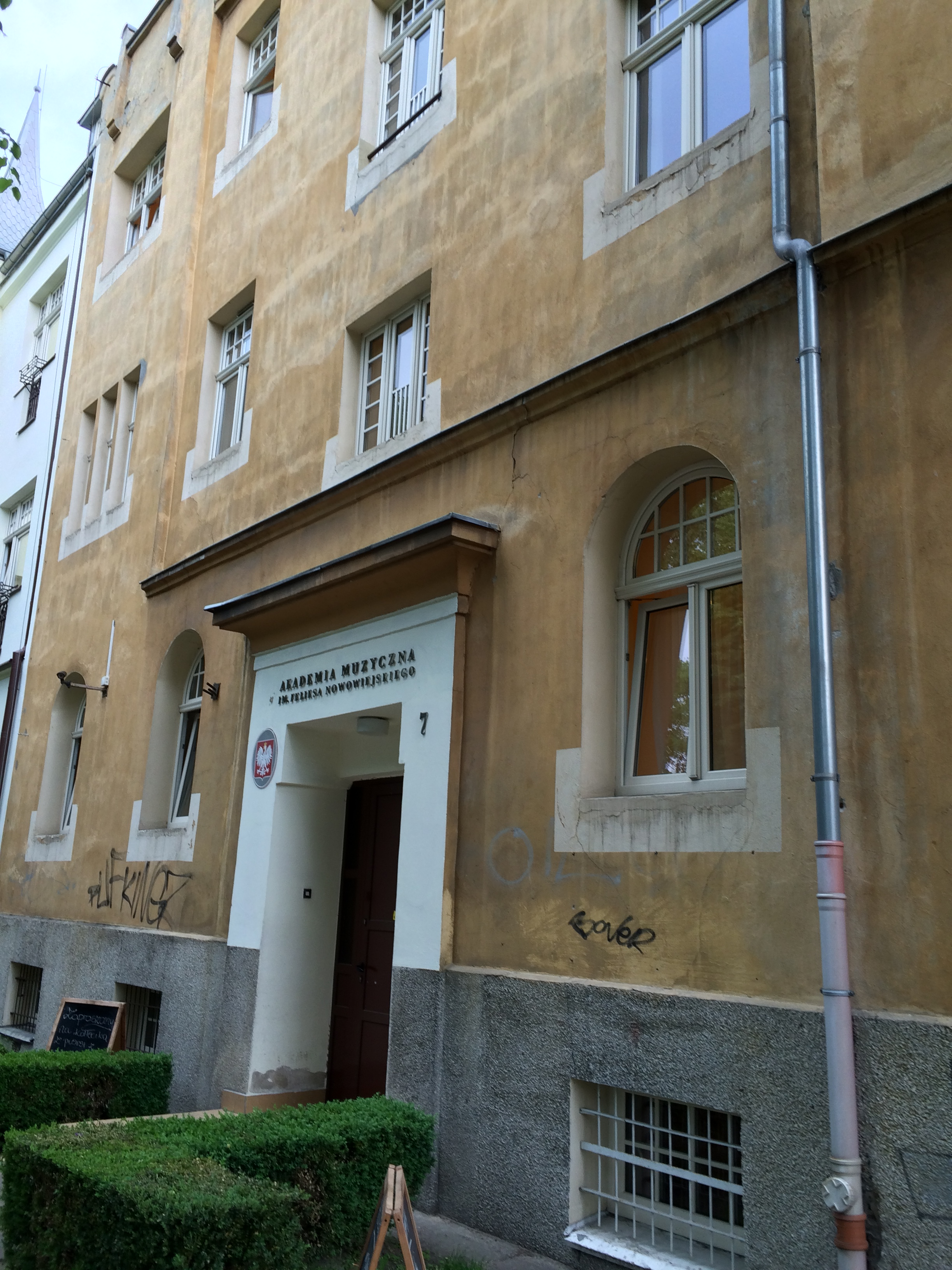
Gate and facade on Staszica street

Ancient shelter for blinds, at 9

Registered on Kuyavian-Pomeranian Voivodeship heritage list, Nr.A/1569, 26 August 2010

1899–1901, by Karl Bergner

Eclecticism & Dutch Mannerism

Built at the beginning of the 20th century, the edifice at Roonstraße 13/14 was initially conceived as a refuge for blind children (German: Blindenheim). The initiator of the construction was the director of nearby Educational Centre for Blind Children, Anton Wittig. He organized the "Society for blind people", which, till 1901, collected funds to build a shelter in home Bydgoszcz. The hostel was operational up to 1962, as part of the specialized school. Today the building houses two clinics, Śródmieście (Downtown, 445m^{2}) and Akademicka (Academic, 312m^{2}), and two specialist medical offices for individuals.

In 2015, city authorities have put the building on sale, with an estimated price of 3.5 million PLN.

The building displays eclectic style, with forms referring to Dutch Mannerism. Two other edifices in Bydgoszcz feature such Dutch-mannerist frontages: the former Prussian Eastern Railway Headquarters and the Lloyd palace. Its brick facades are plaster decorated with architectural details. Slight avant-corps, ornamented with bossage, are crowned with volute adorned gables and pinnacles. Windows are topped with cornices. Main entrance on Kołłątaja street bears the inscription "Blindenheim " ("Home for Blind"). It is positioned at the centre of the avant-corps and includes an ornated portal with doric columns.

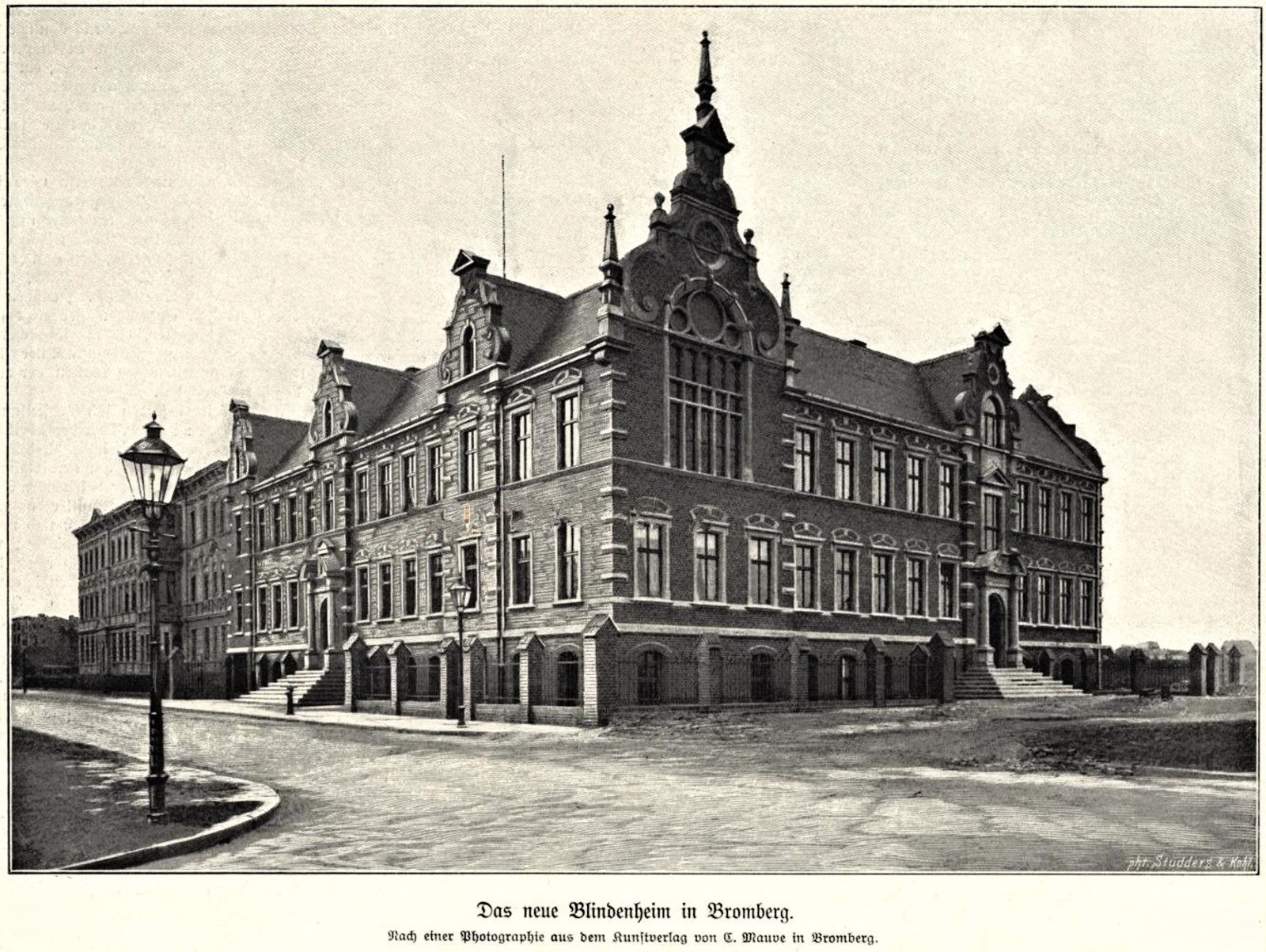
"Blindenheim" ca 1902

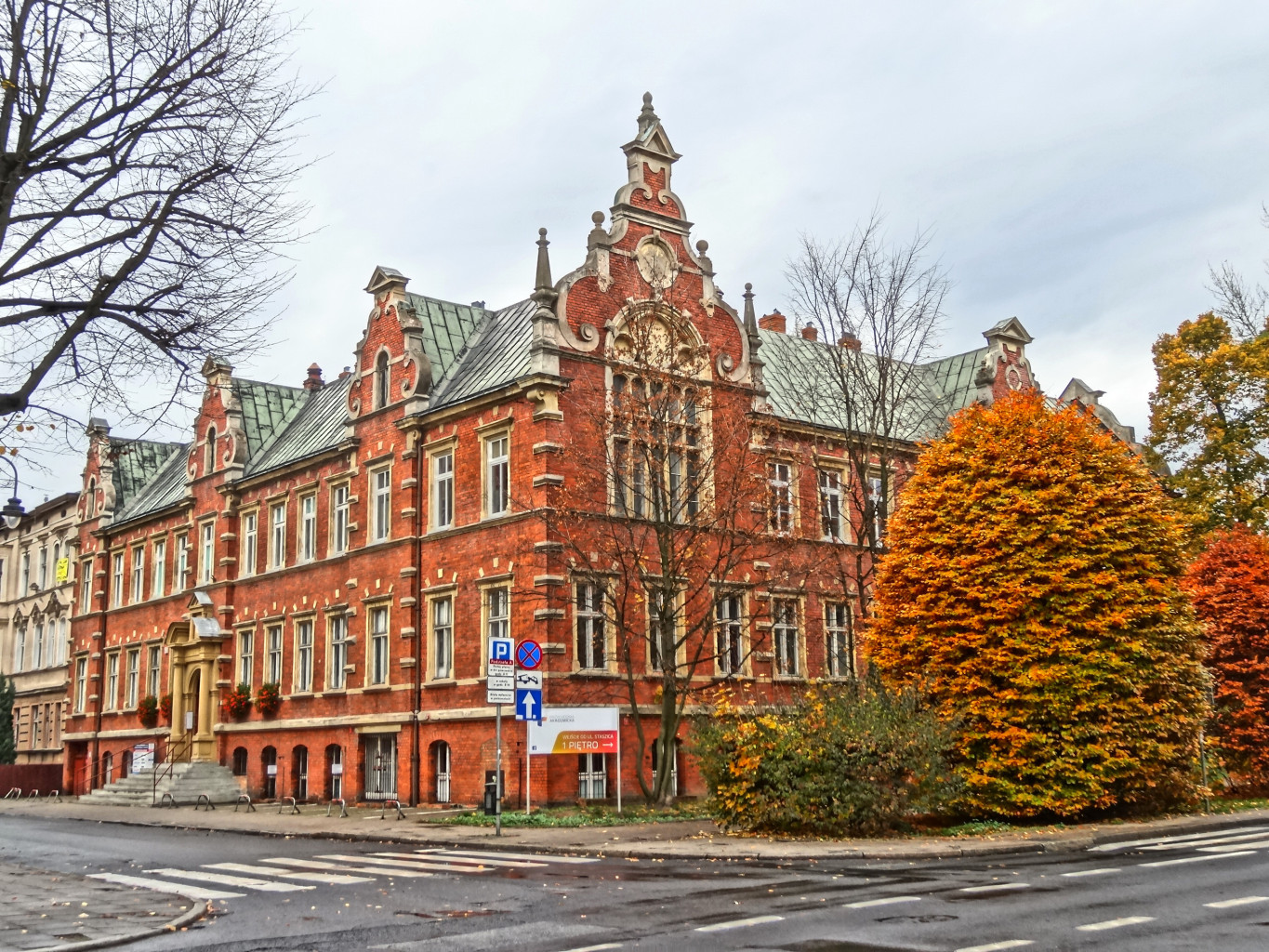
Current view

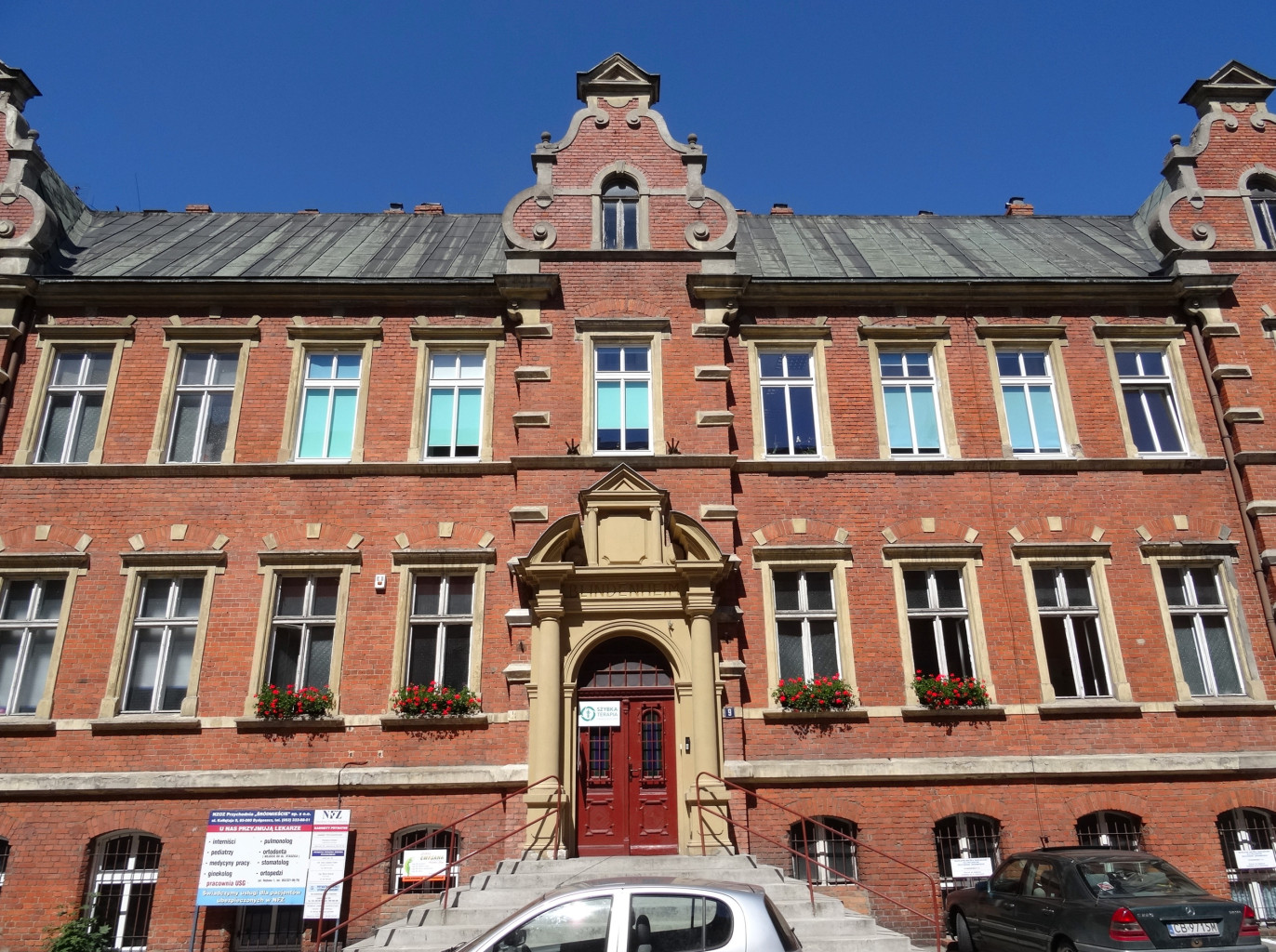
Main elevation on Kołłątaja street

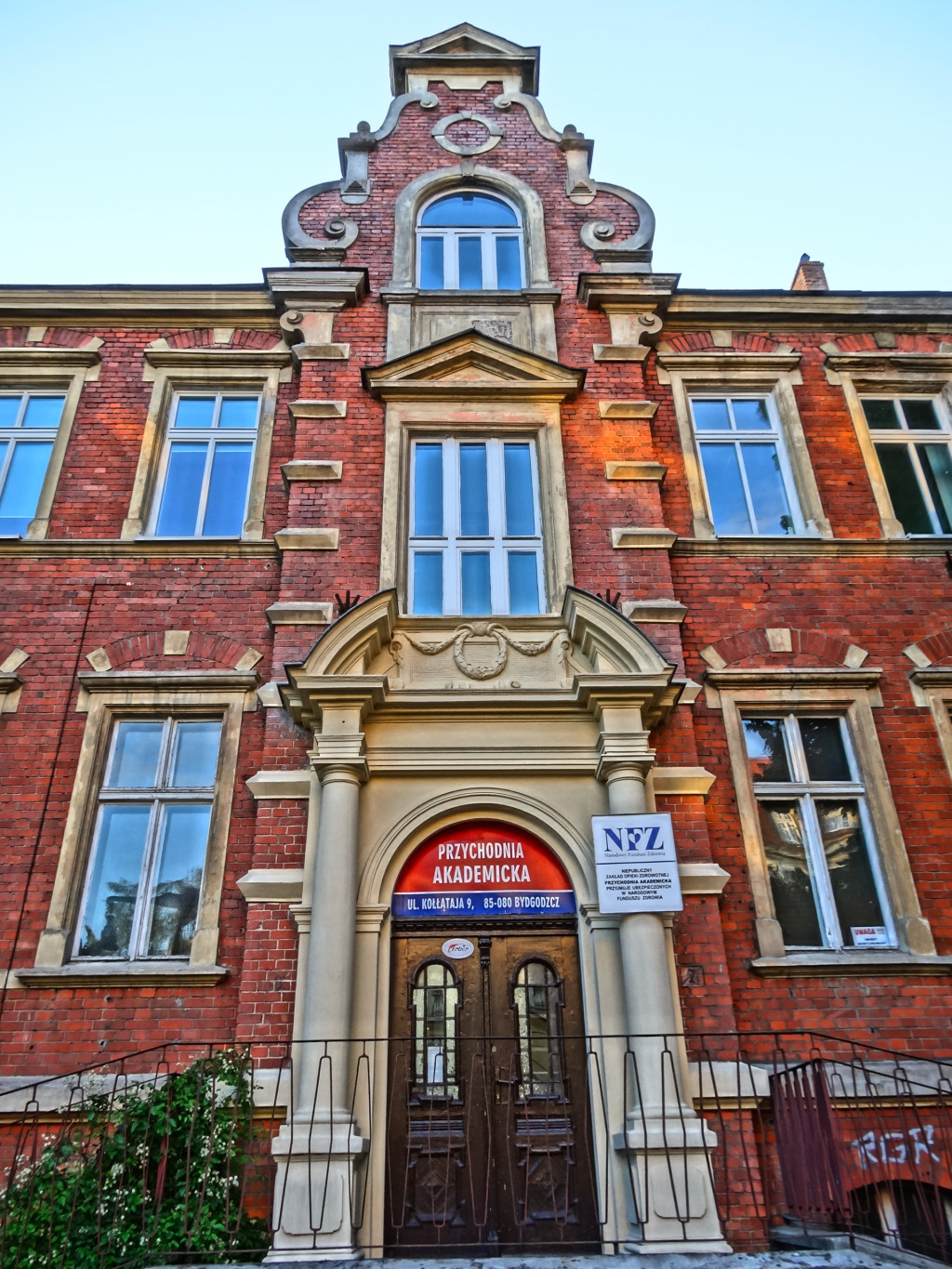
Entrance on Staszica street

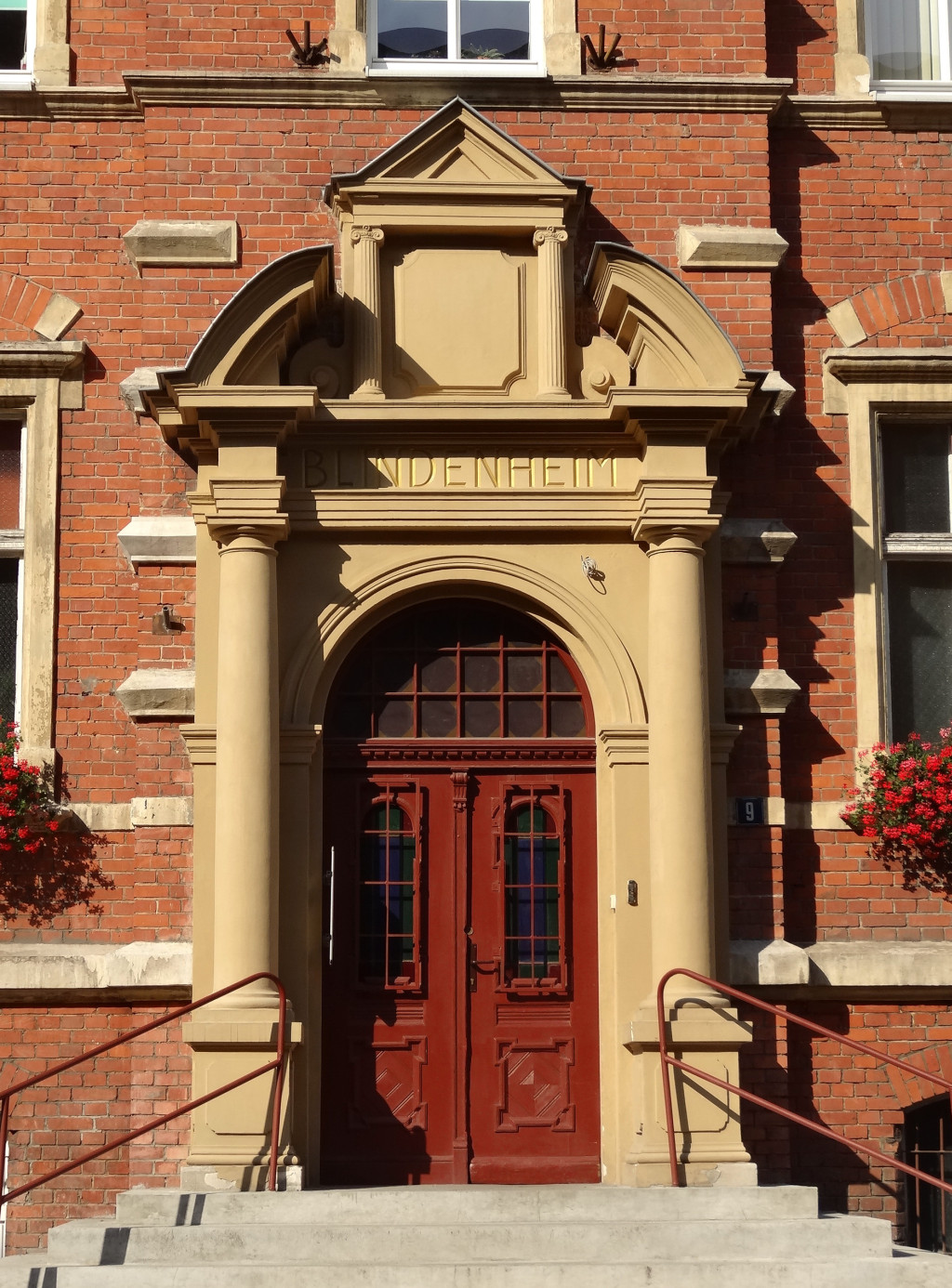
Detail of the portal on Kołłątaja street

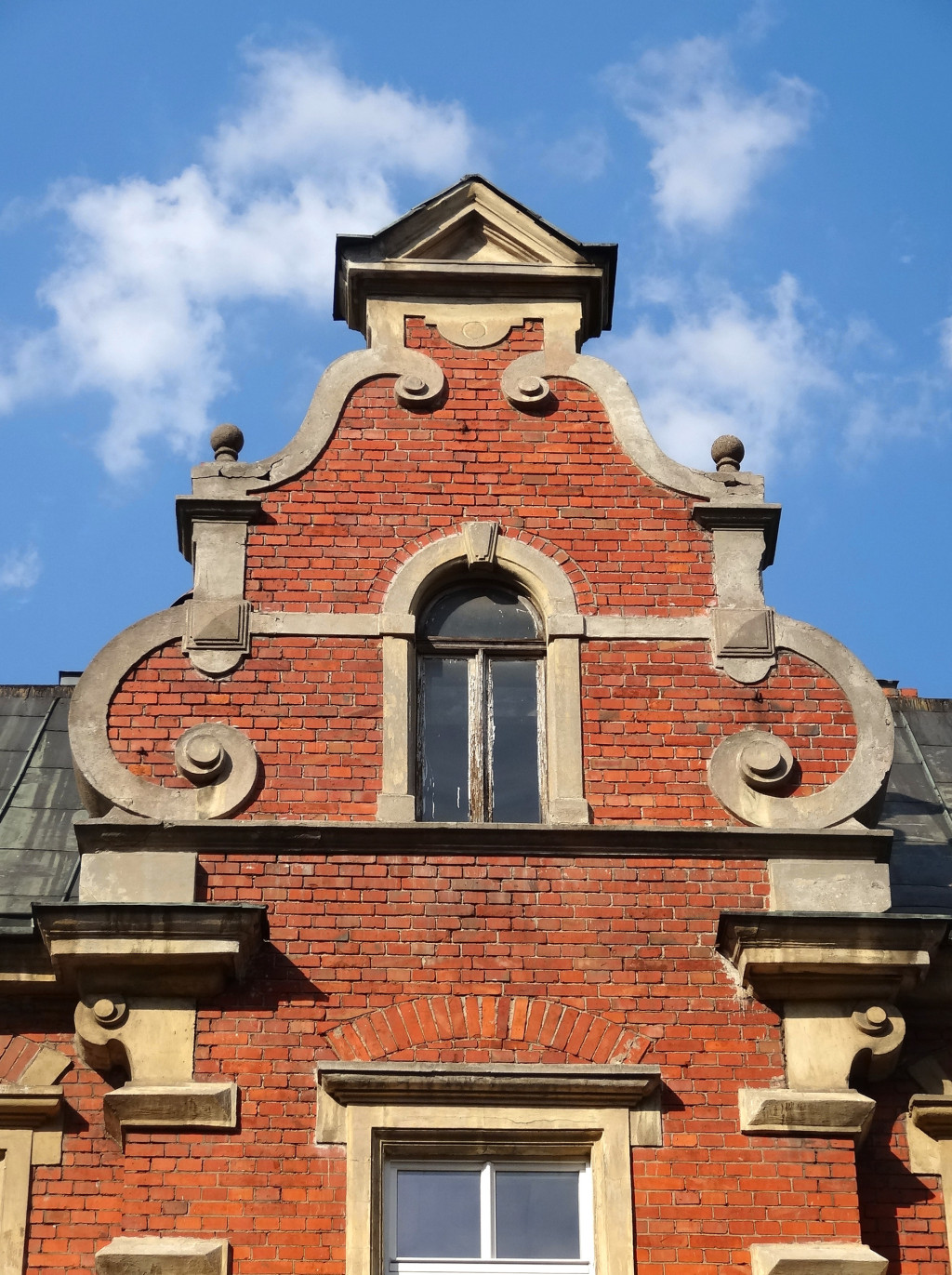
Detail of a gable

=== Paderewskiego Street ===
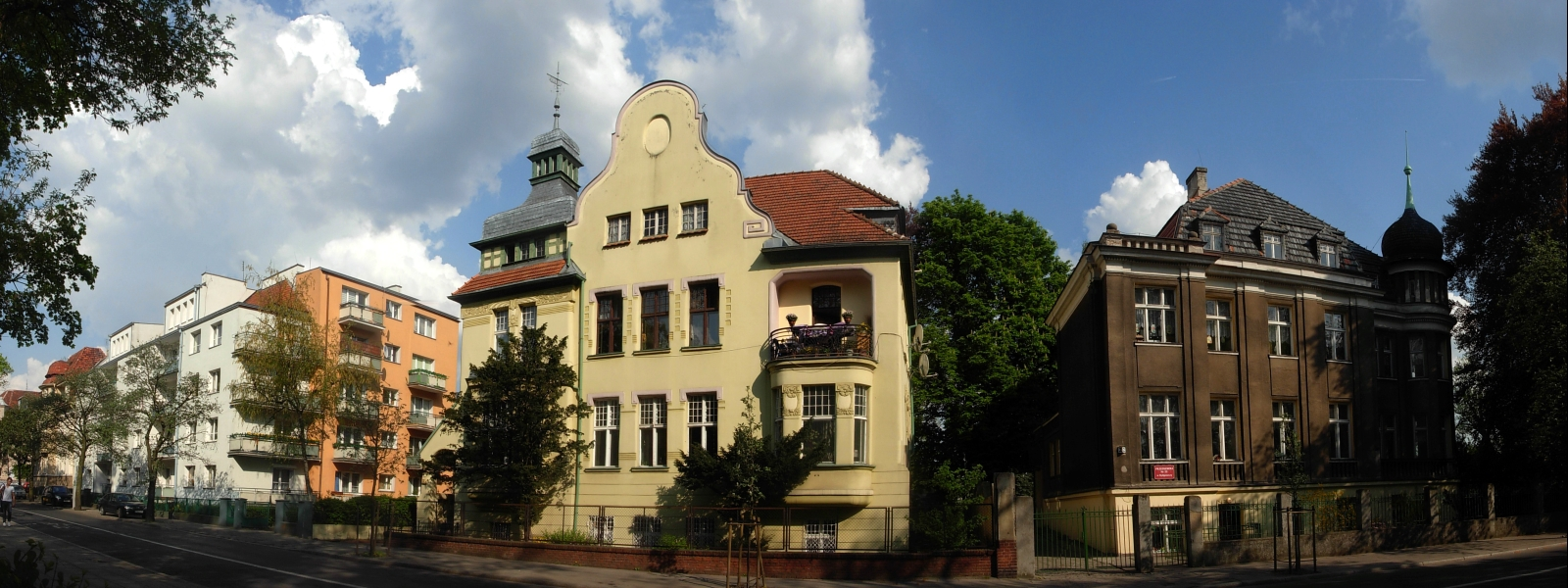
Panorama of villas at Nr.2 (right) and 4 (left) in Paderewskiego street

Copernicanum building, at 1 Kopernika Street

Registered on the Kuyavian-Pomeranian Heritage list Nr.601363, reg.A/784 (5 May 1992)

1903–1906, by Carl Zaar and Rudolf Vahl

Secession Style

The building had many owners: initially a Prussian realschule, then a city high school for mathematics and natural sciences, it housed a military hospital during German occupation. In 1923, to celebrate the 450th anniversary of the birth of Nicolaus Copernicus, the then junior high school adopted his name. The University of Casimir the Great has been the current owner of the edifice since 2005.

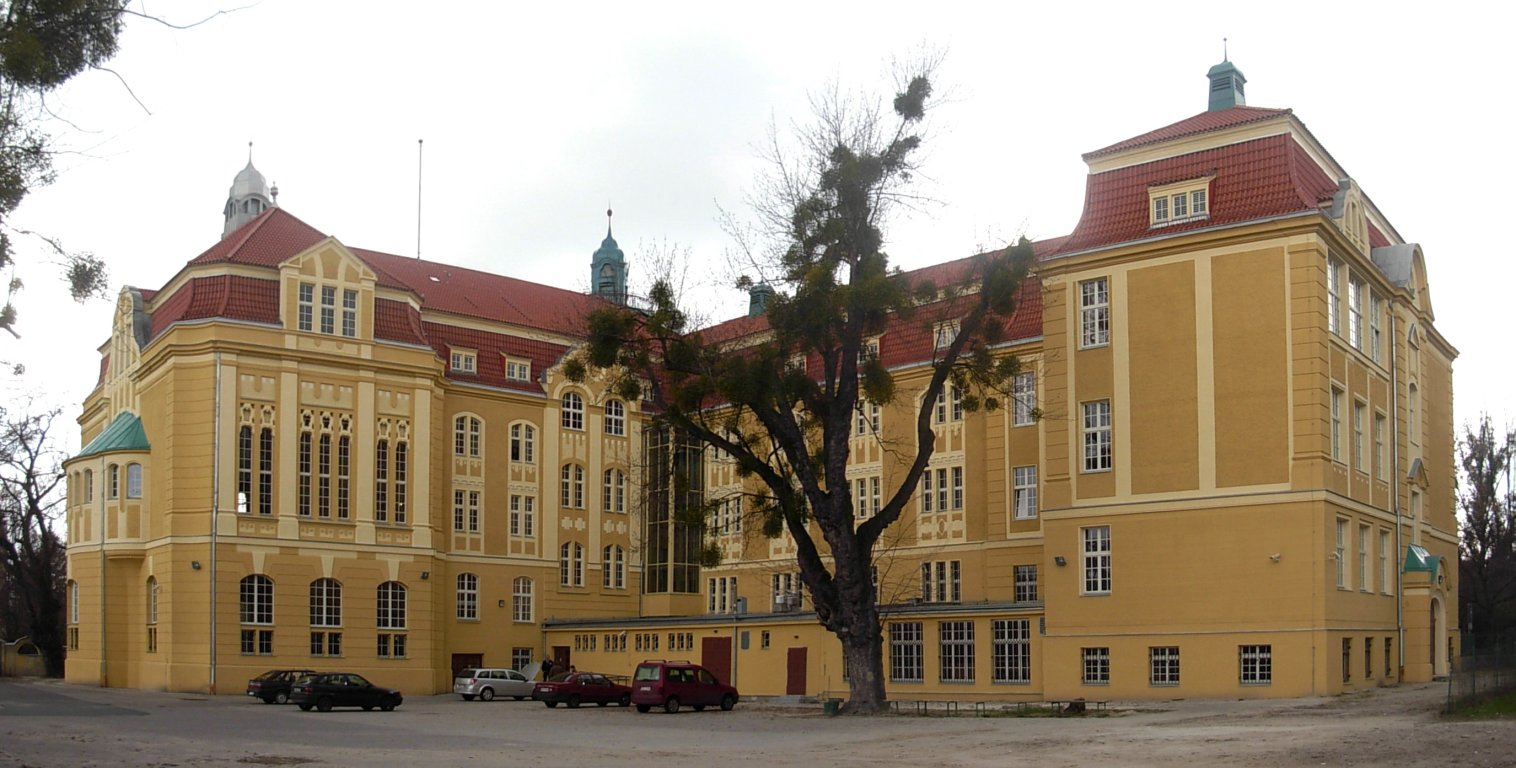
View of backyard

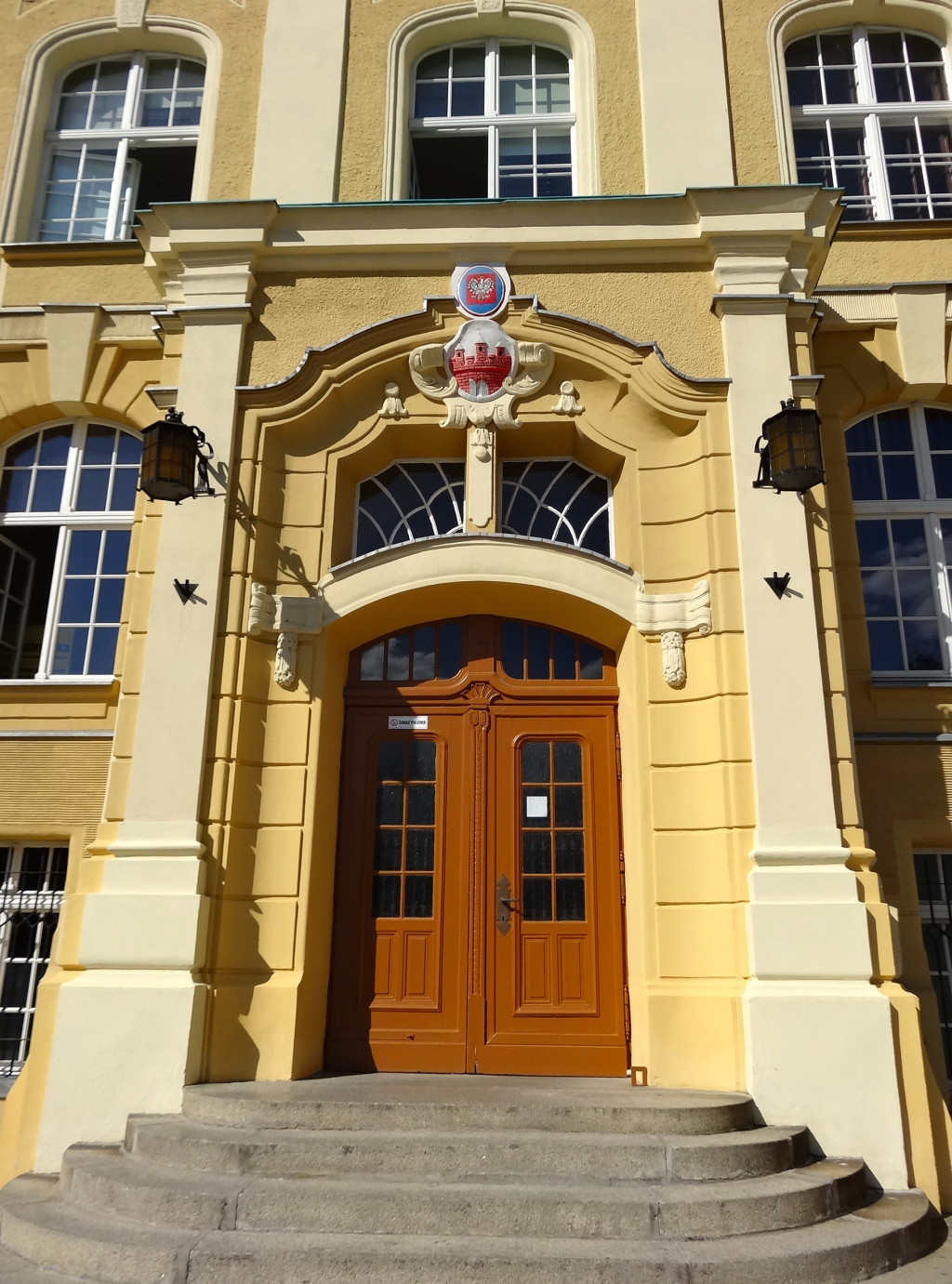
Main portal

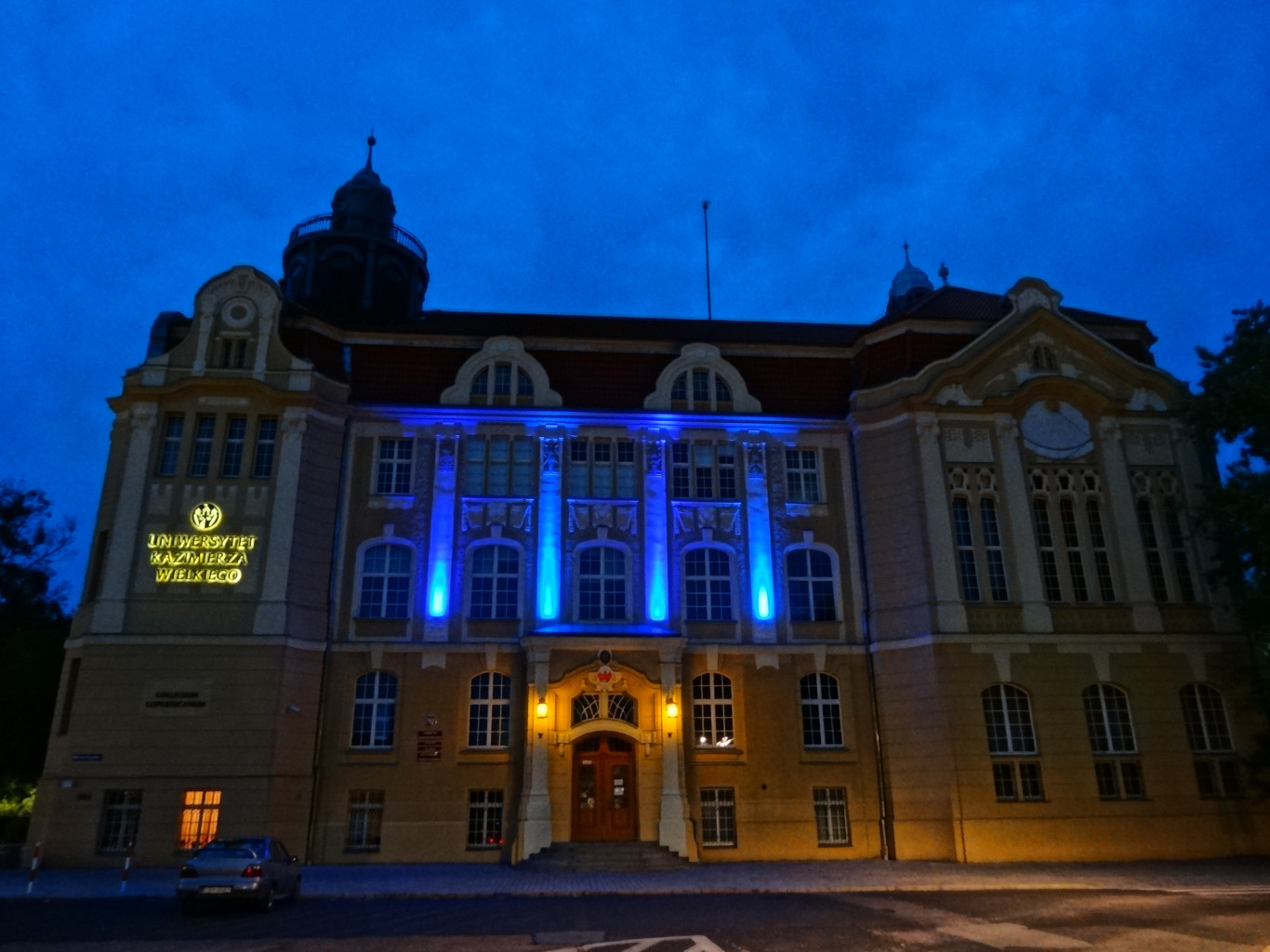
By night

Jan Kochanowski Park in Bydgoszcz

1901, by Konrad Neumann

The park is located in an area urbanized at the beginning of the 20th century; it covers 3,15 ha. It hosts an outdoor gallery of monuments of composers and virtuoso, as well as the iconic local statue "The Archer".

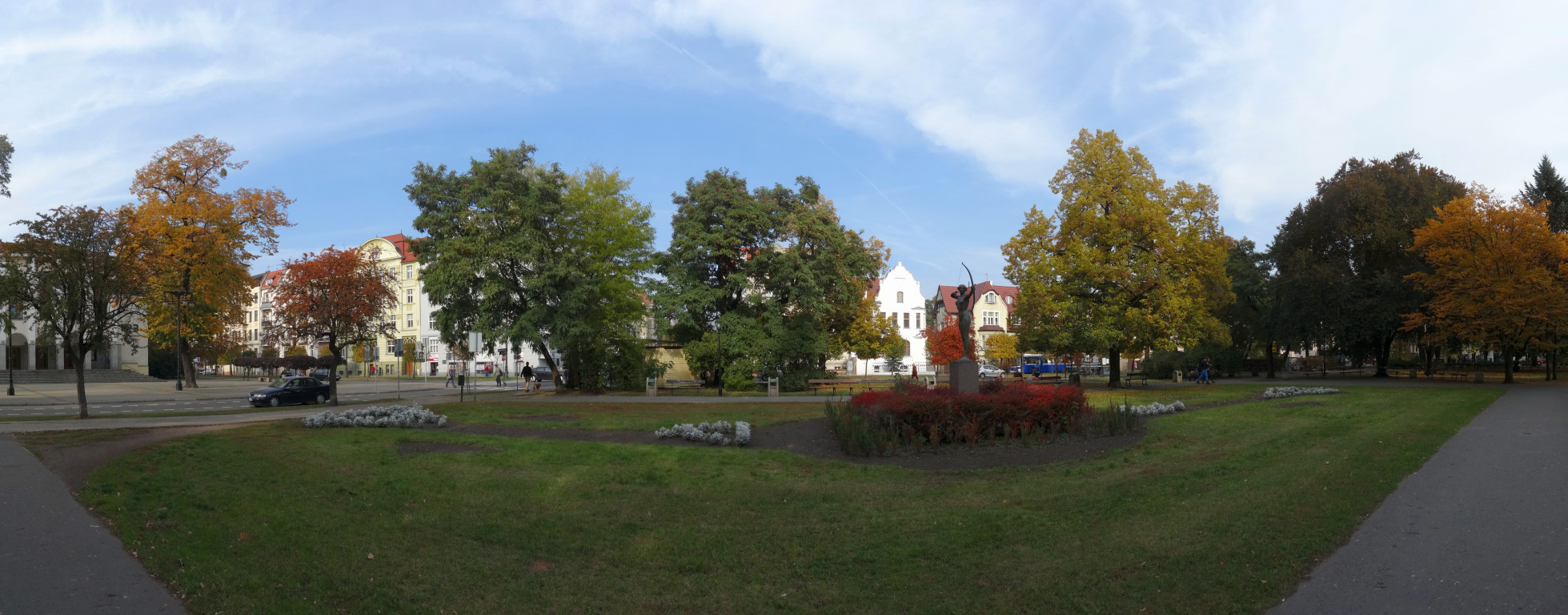
Panoramic view

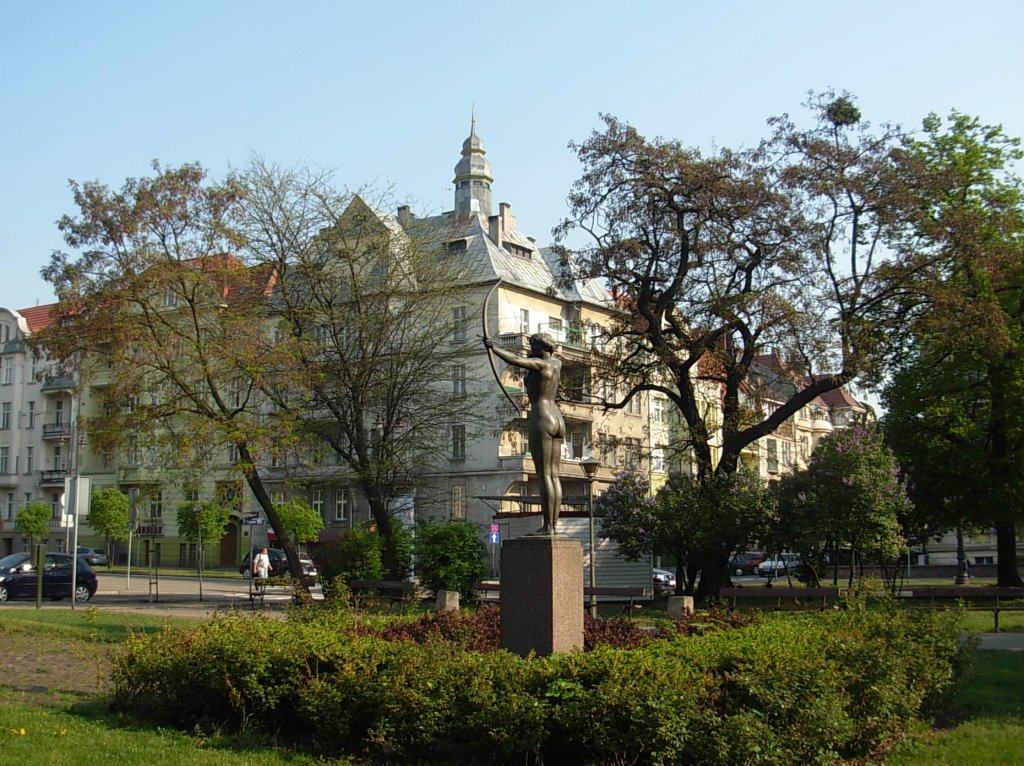
The park with the famous "Archer"

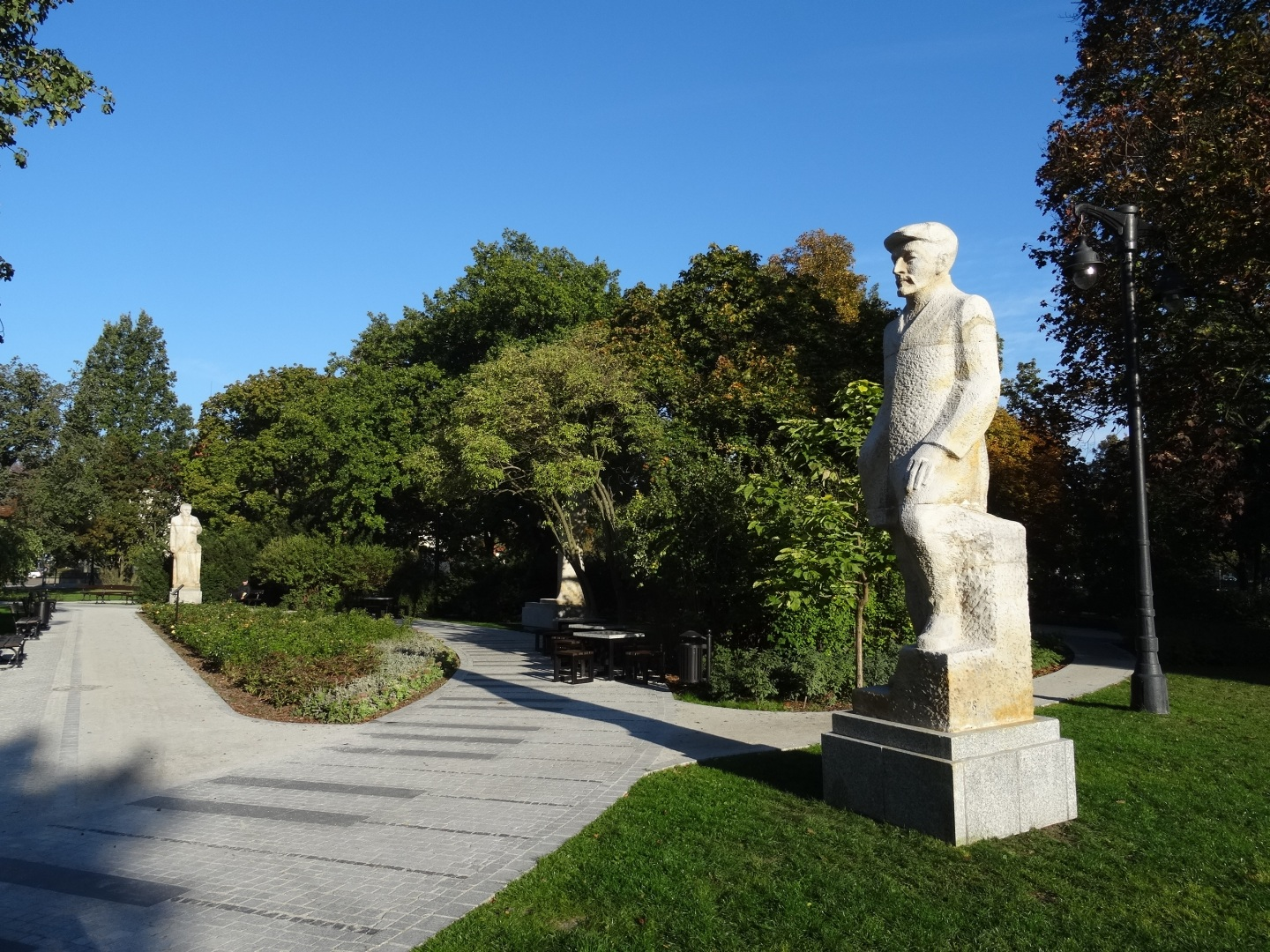
View with one composer monument on the foreground

Tenement at 1, corner with Adam Mickiewicz Alley

1905–1908, by Paul Sellner

Art Nouveau

Built in the first years of the 20th century on a commission by Wilhelm Knelke, a manufacturer, its first landlord was a rentier, Ferdinand Krauße. In 1908, Mr Friedländer, a banker, purchased the building: his widow lived there till the end of WWI.

This corner building displays typical tin roof above each of its bay windows. The main door features Art Nouveau motifs and patterns.

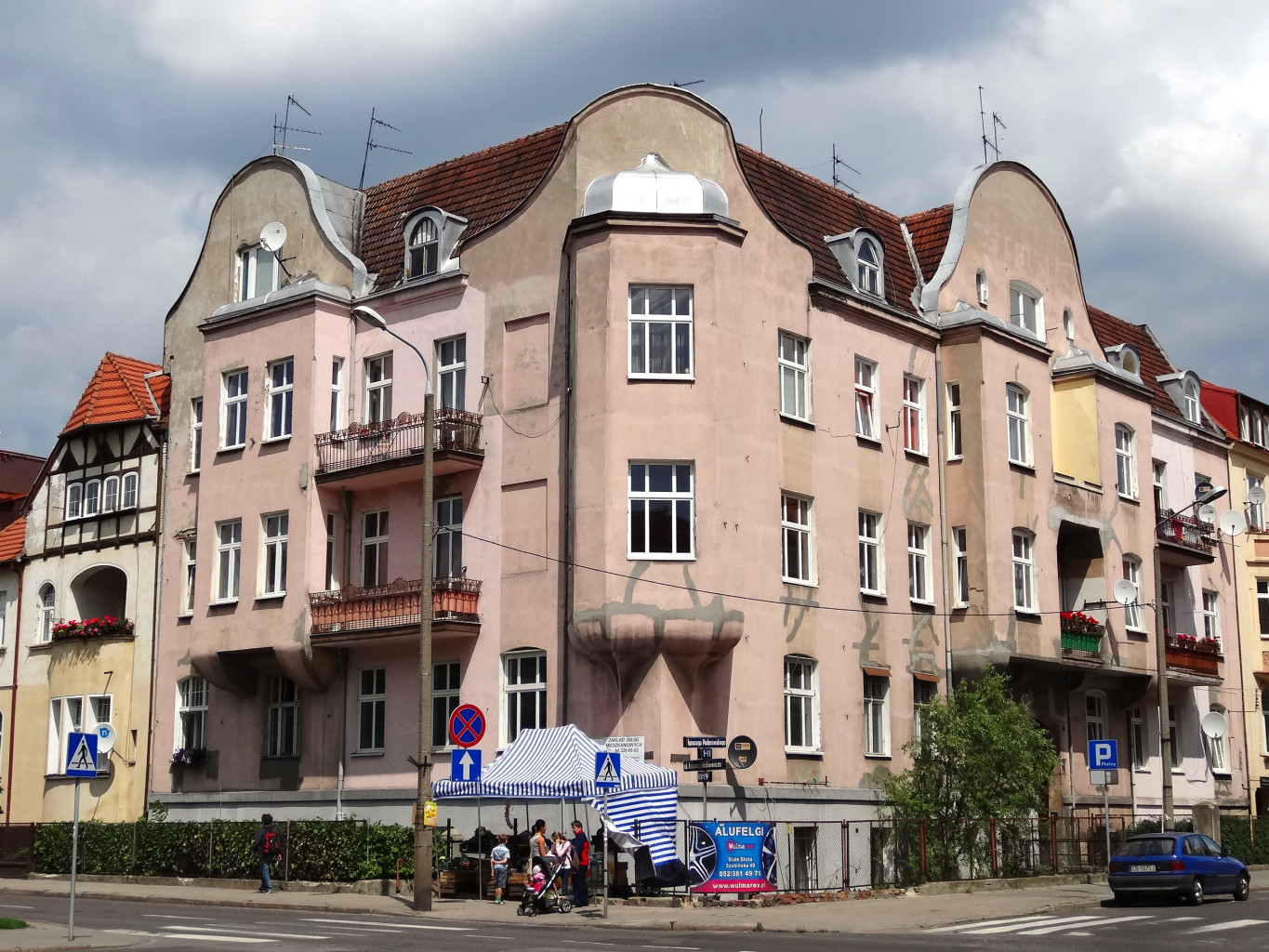
General view of both frontages

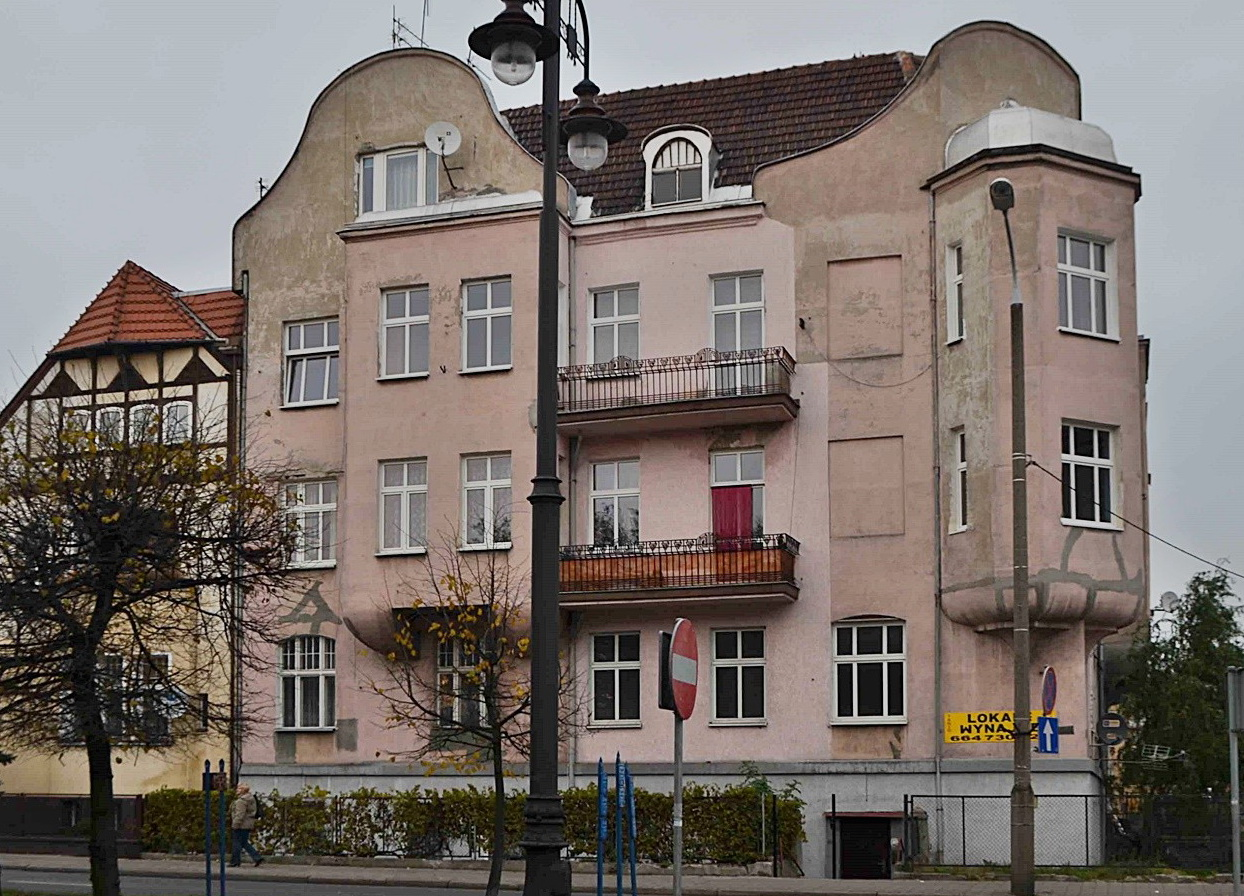
Elevation on Paderewskiego street

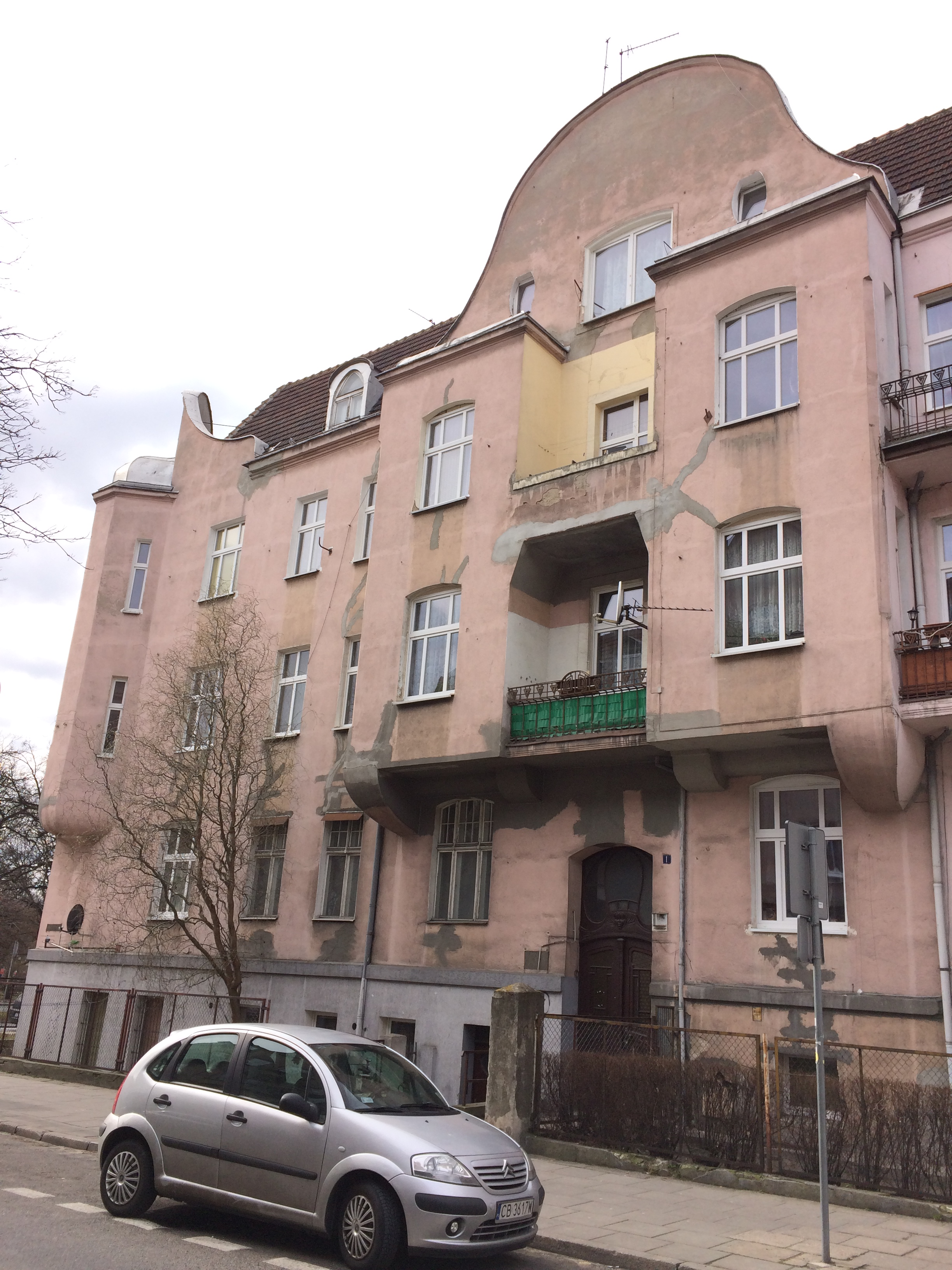
Facade on Mickiewicz Alley

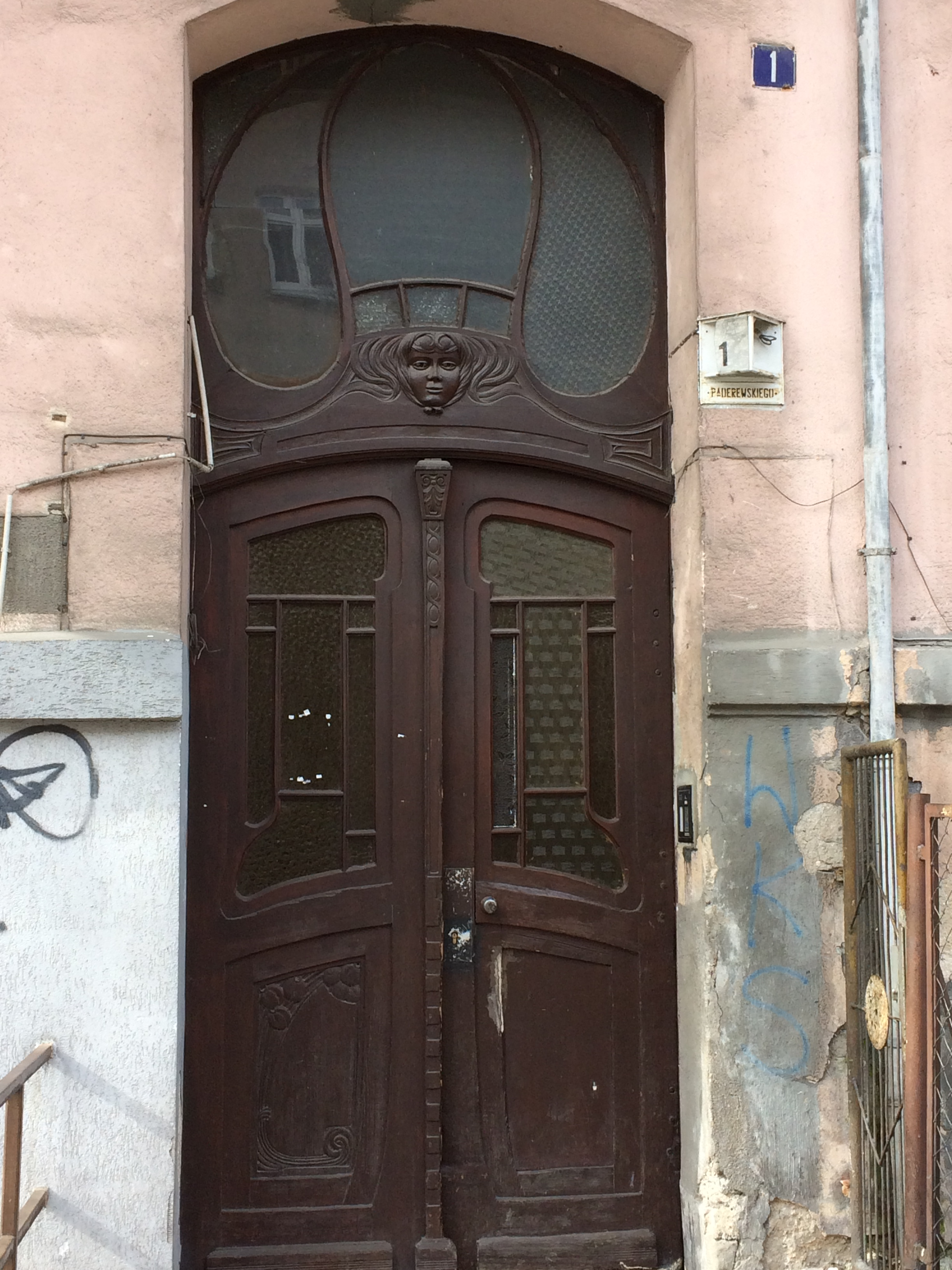
Art Nouveau style gate

Woythaler house, at 2

1910–1912, by Julius Knűpfer

Eclecticism, elements of Art Nouveau

David Woythaler commissioned this villa at the beginning of the 20th century: he was the director of one of the largest manufacturers of snuff tobacco in Prussia, located at today's Focha street 18. After the First World War and the re-establishment of Poland, the villa changed ownership. In 1948, a public kindergarten had been set up here (Polish: Przedszkole nr 22), but moved to Fordon in the 2010s. Today, the building houses a private kindergarten.

This large villa keeps its original features: a massive avant-corps on the left side, with a terrace on the top, and a lean tower bordering the right side, crowned by a characteristic onion dome and a finial.

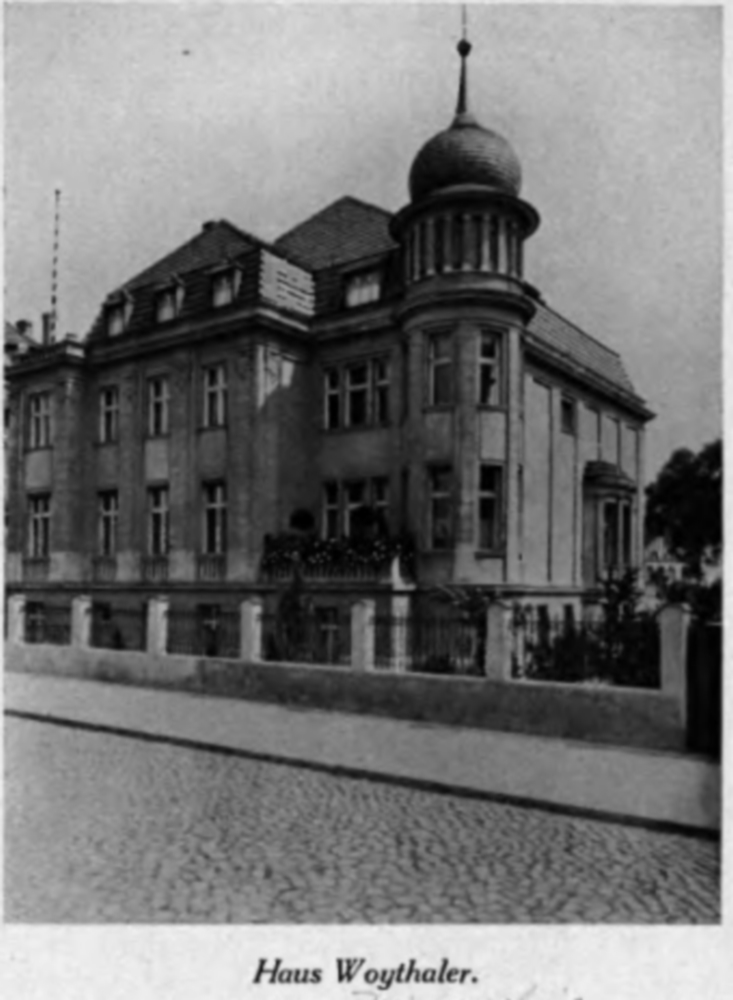
House Woythaler ca 1913

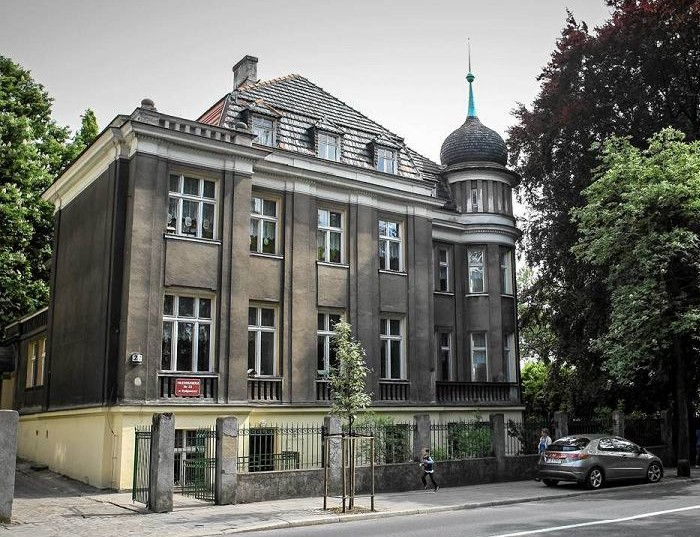
View of the villa from the Park

Tenement at 3

1906, by Wilhelm Knelke

Art Nouveau

Wilhelm Knelke, director of a limestone factory, was the first landlord of the building, though he never lived there.

One of the oldest buildings in the street, the frontage features interesting ornaments: rosettes in a frieze crowning the transom light gate, two adorned bay windows with cartouches and a large gable dormer embellished with vegetal Art Nouveau stuccos. The tenement has been renovated in 2017.

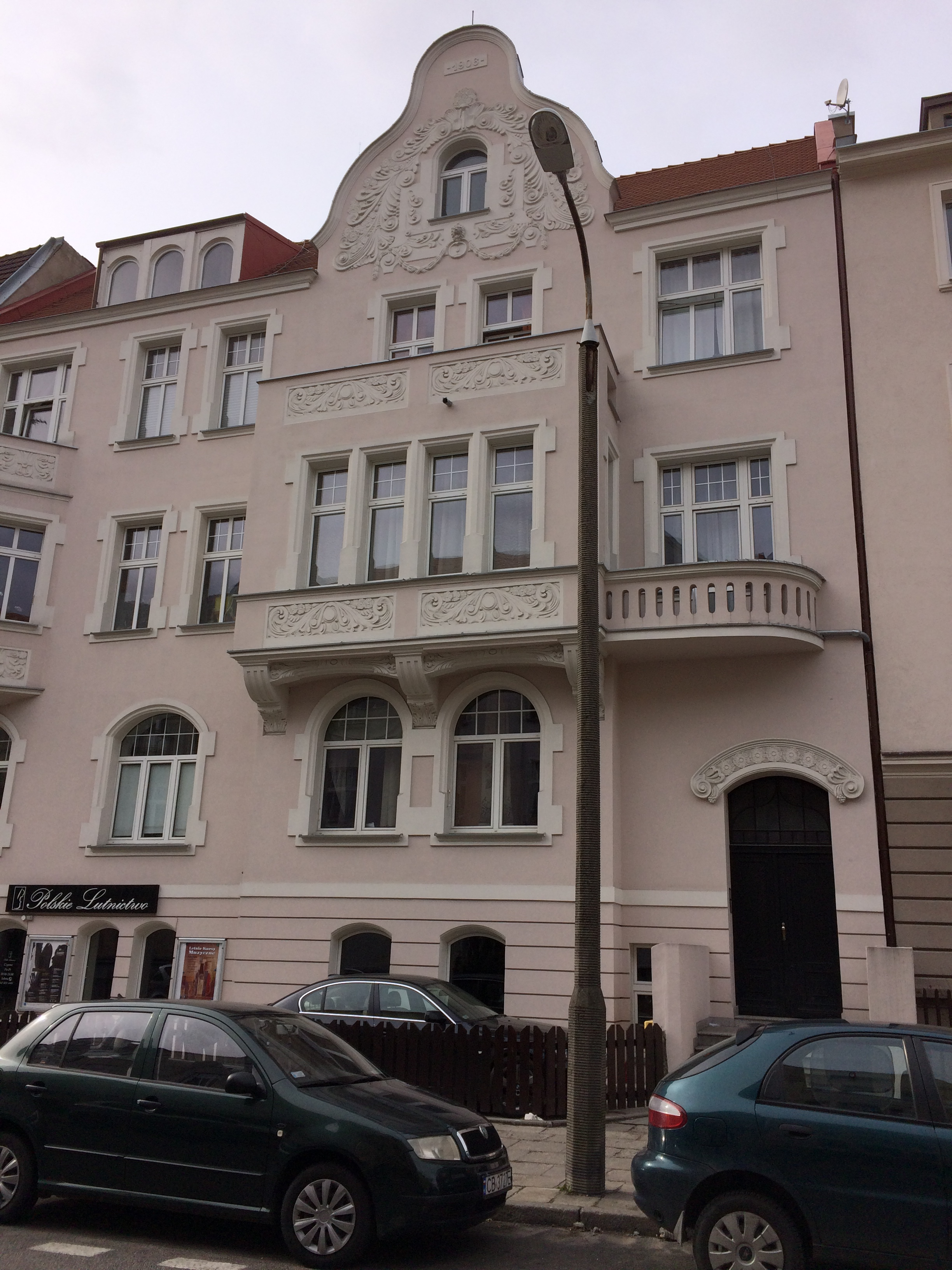
Main elevation on the street

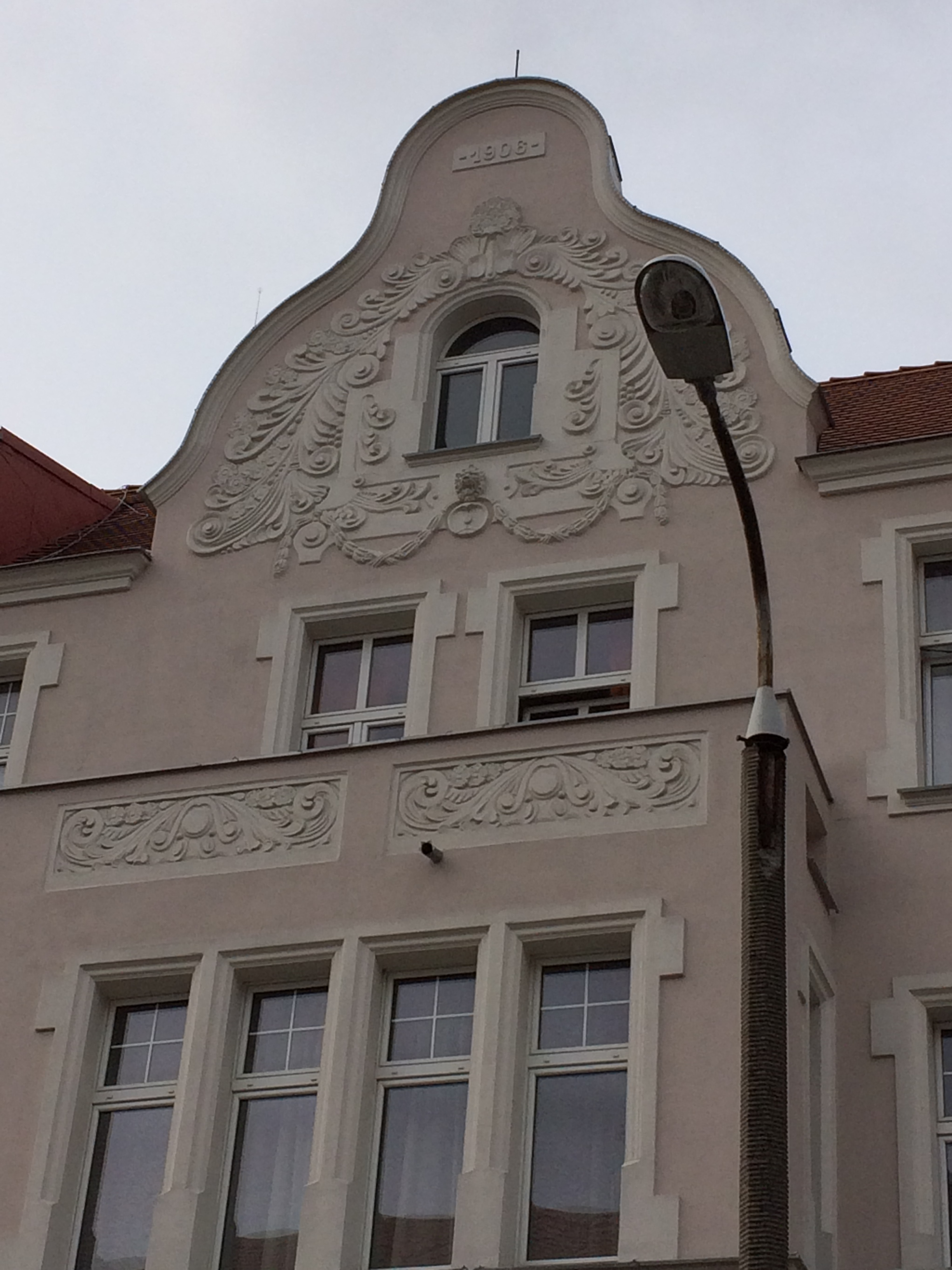
Adorned balcony and gable

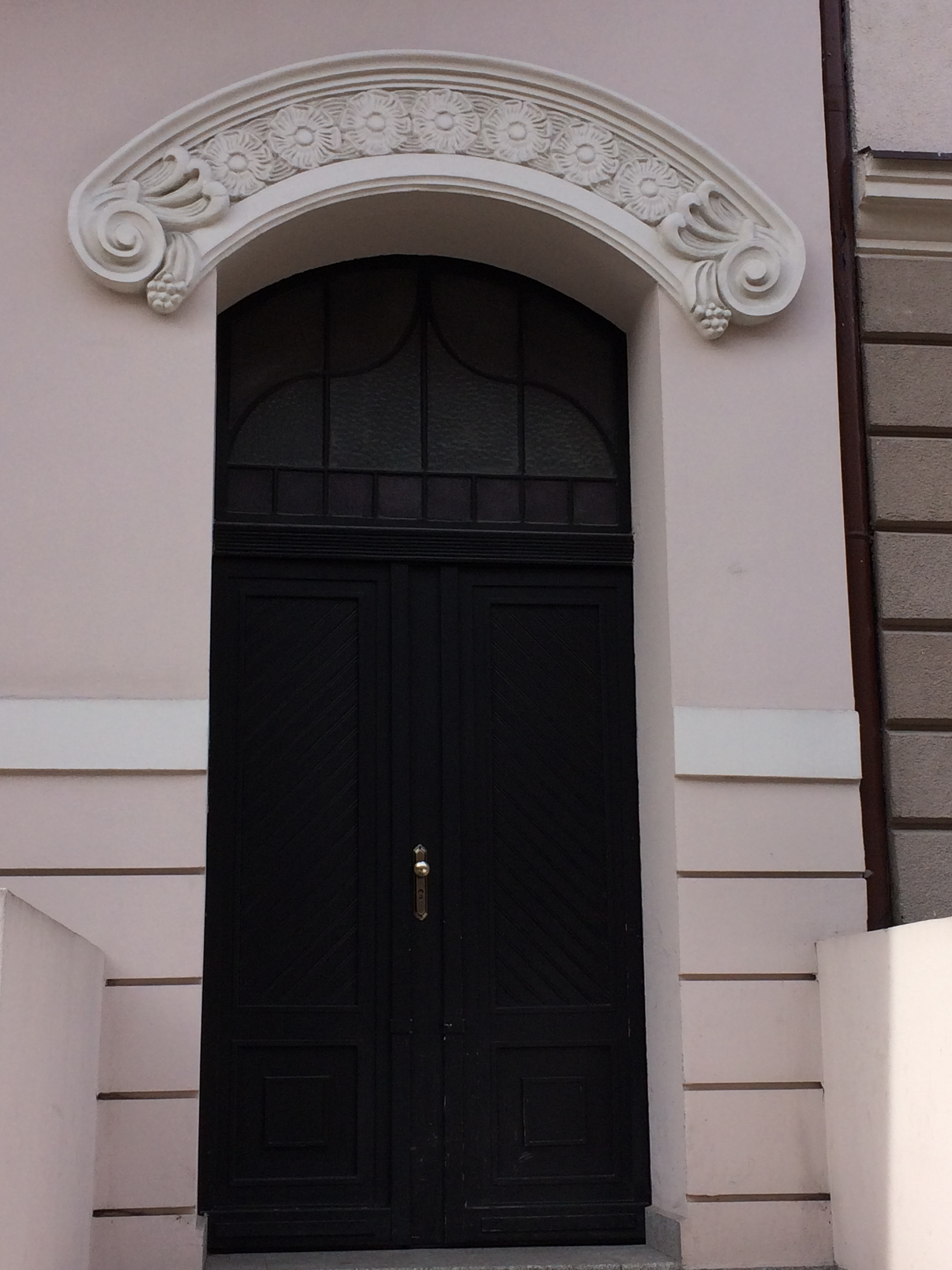
Entry gate

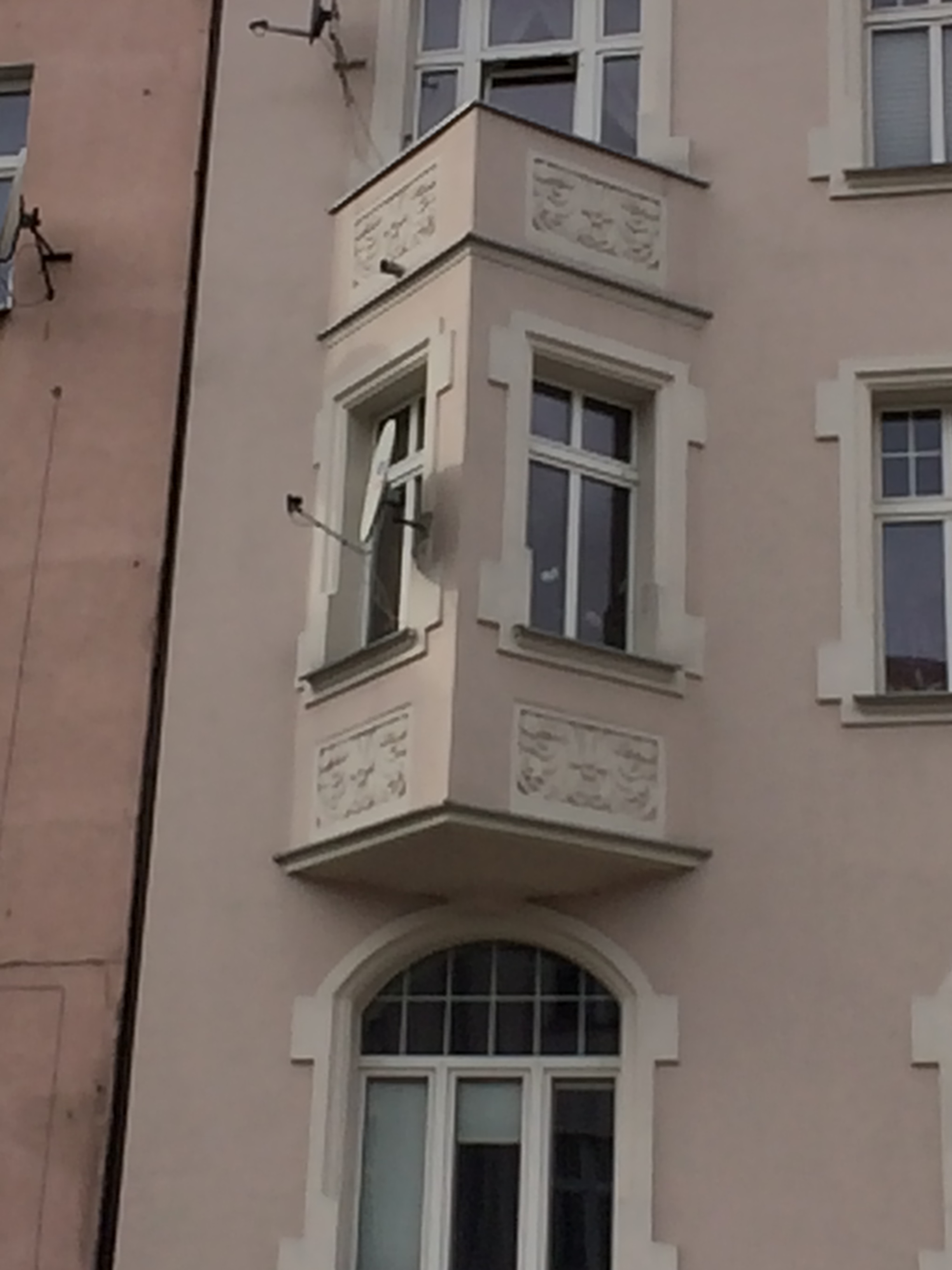
Triangular bay window

Max Eichenberg's Villa, at 4

1904, by Rudolf Kern

Art Nouveau

Rudolf Kern designed this villa for Max Eichenberg, a rentier; at the time, the address was Schillerstraße 18. Soon, in 1910, Alfred Hübschmann, a merchant in clothing business, bought the house and lived there until the First World War.

The villa, one of the oldest in the street, is iconic of the Art Nouveau architecture in Bydgoszcz. Noticeable are fanciful metal elements, ornaments with the faces of women and fish as well as insects and plants. Also part of the villa are characteristic friezes featuring floral ornamentation in the lintels, in cartouches, on bay windows and at the gate. Wrought iron motifs are chiseled above the entry. The gable is topped by a delicate wattle and daub turret crowned by a finial.

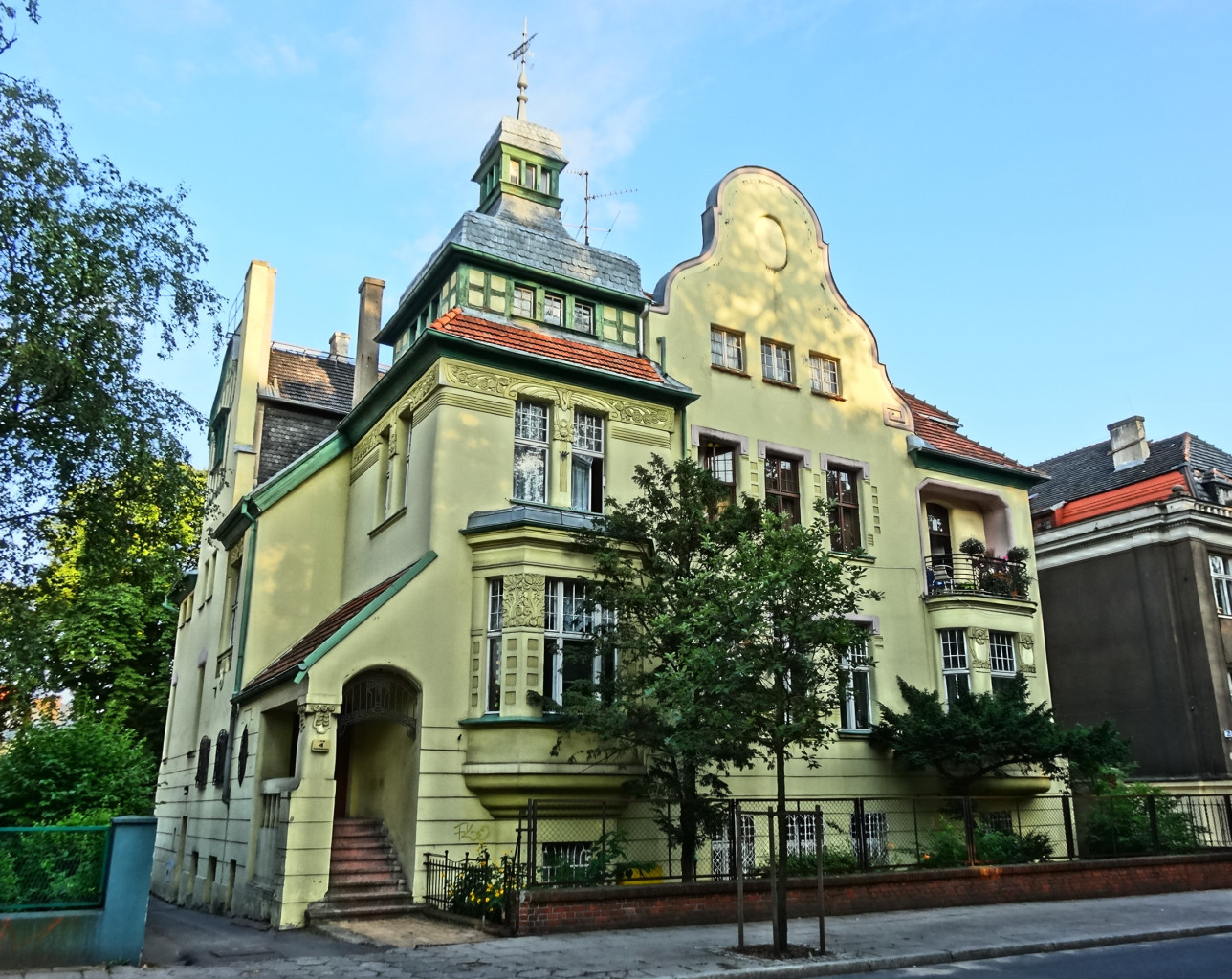
View of the villa from the street

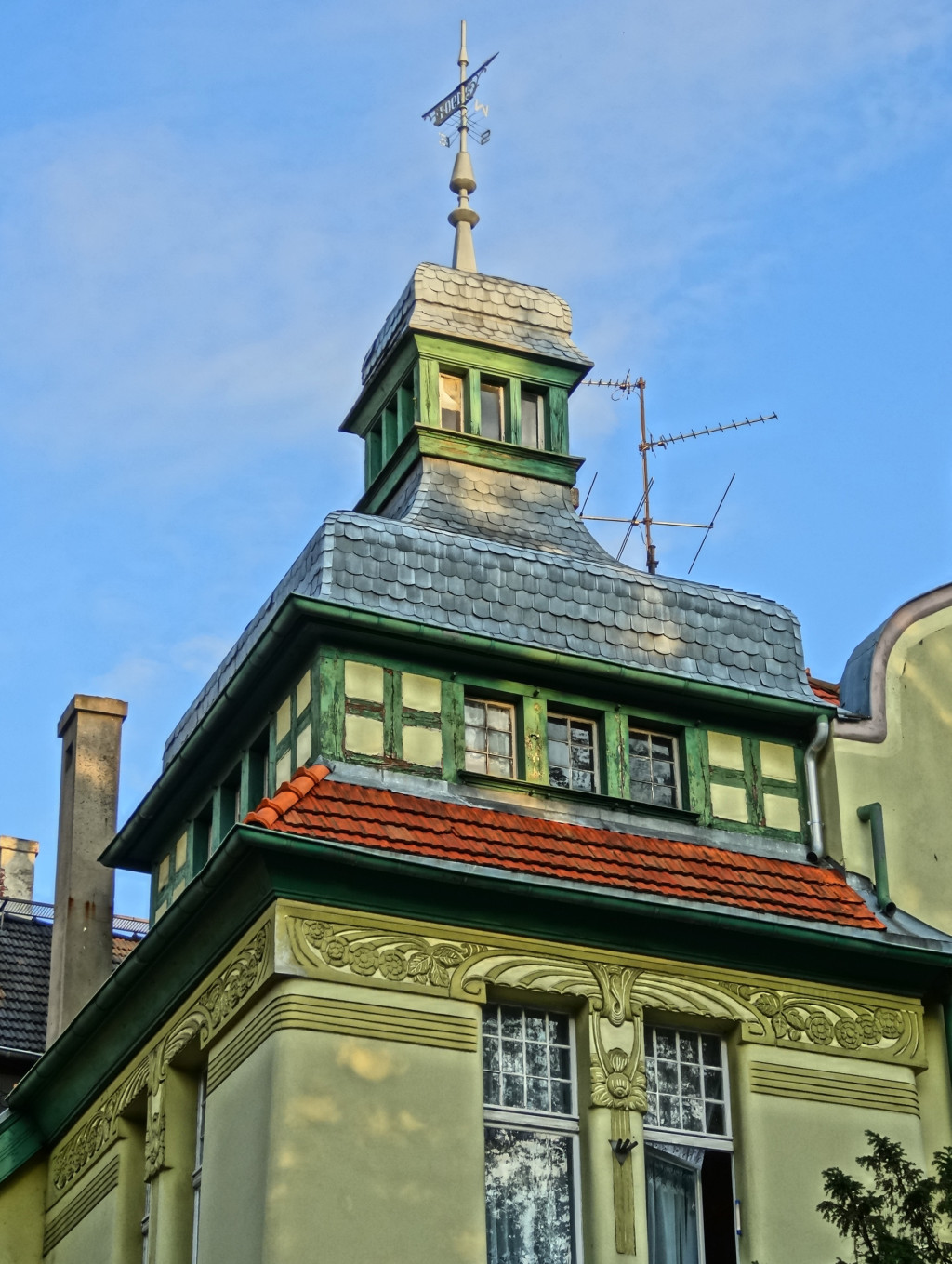
Detail of the side turret

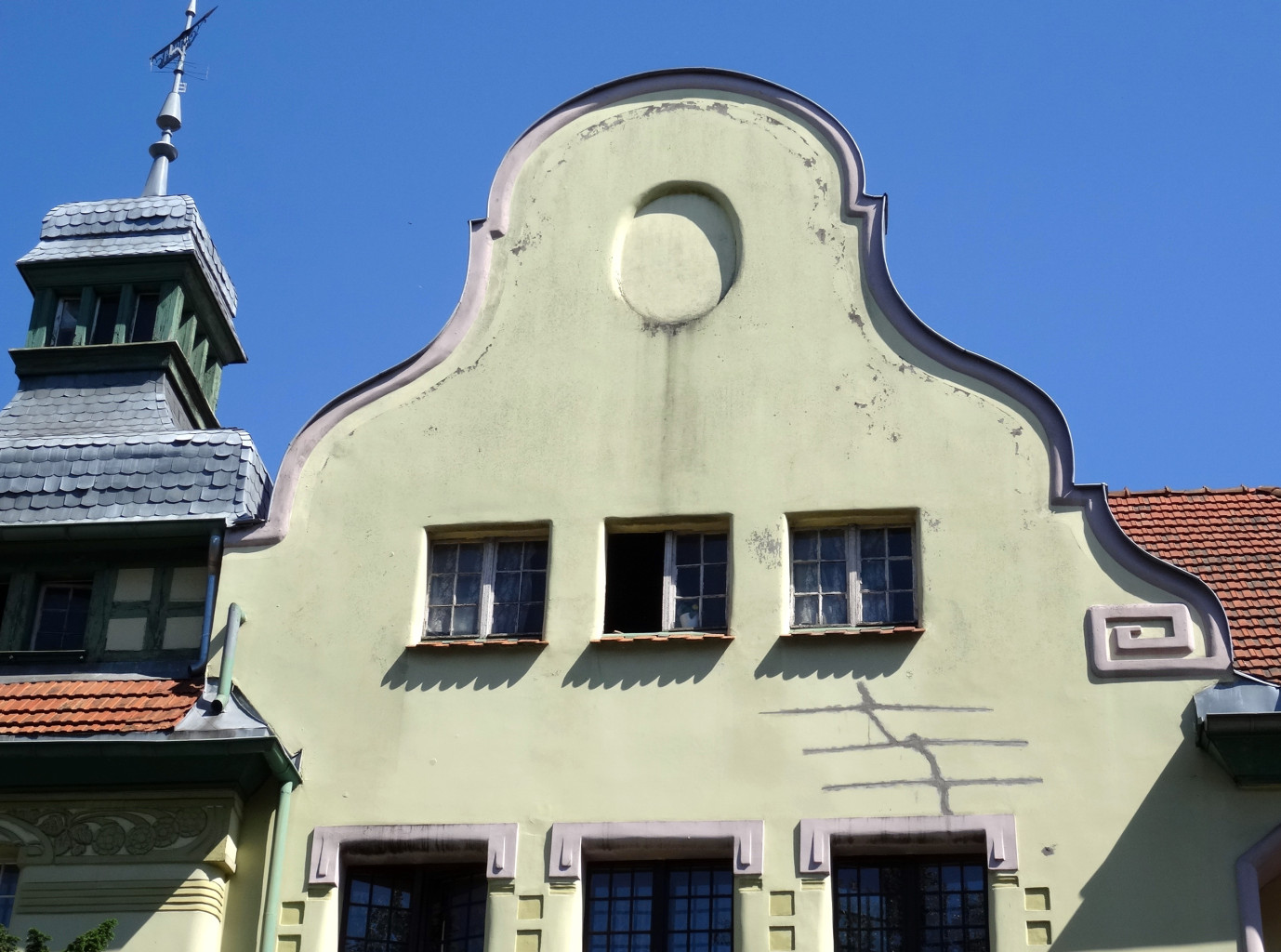
Ogee wall dormer

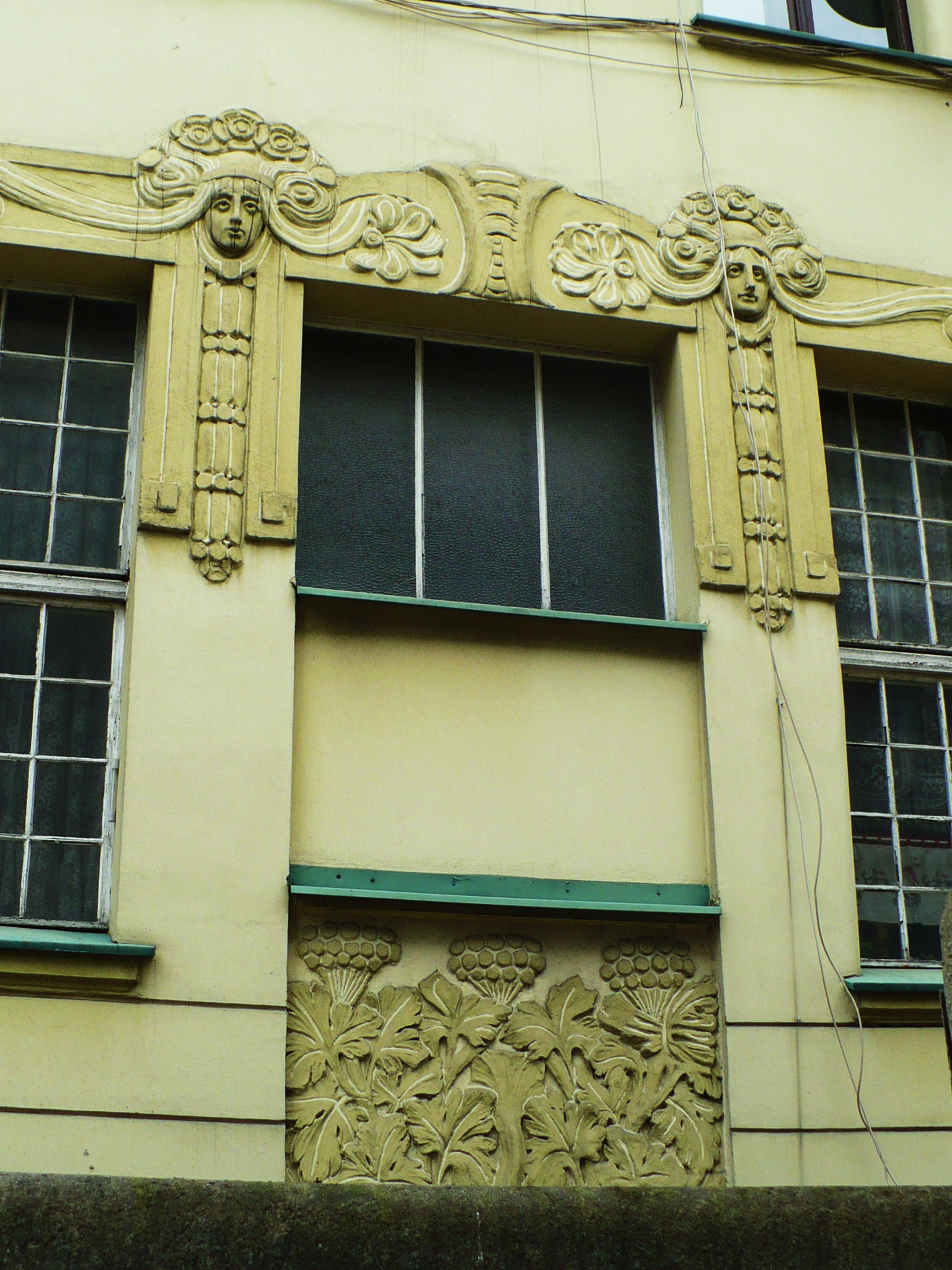
Art Nouveau motifs

Building at 4 Adam Mickiewicz Alley, corner with Paderewskiego Street

1906–1908

Art Nouveau

This building displays highly decorated balconies and bay windows. The roof boasts eyelid dormers.

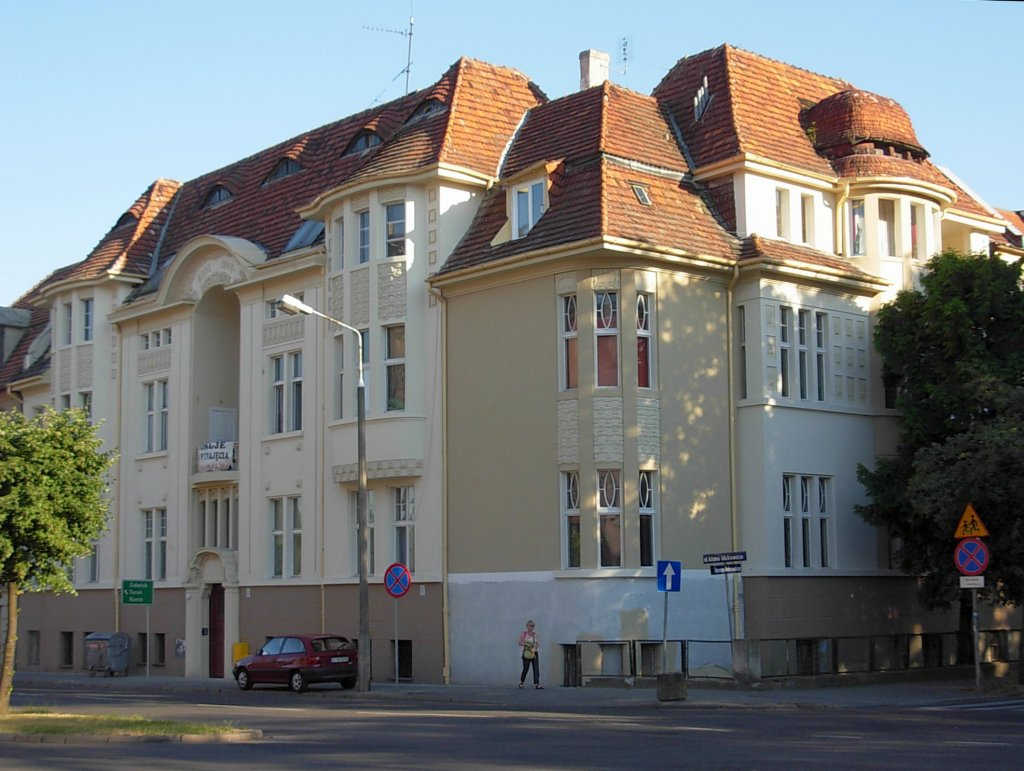
View of the frontage from Mickiewicz Alley

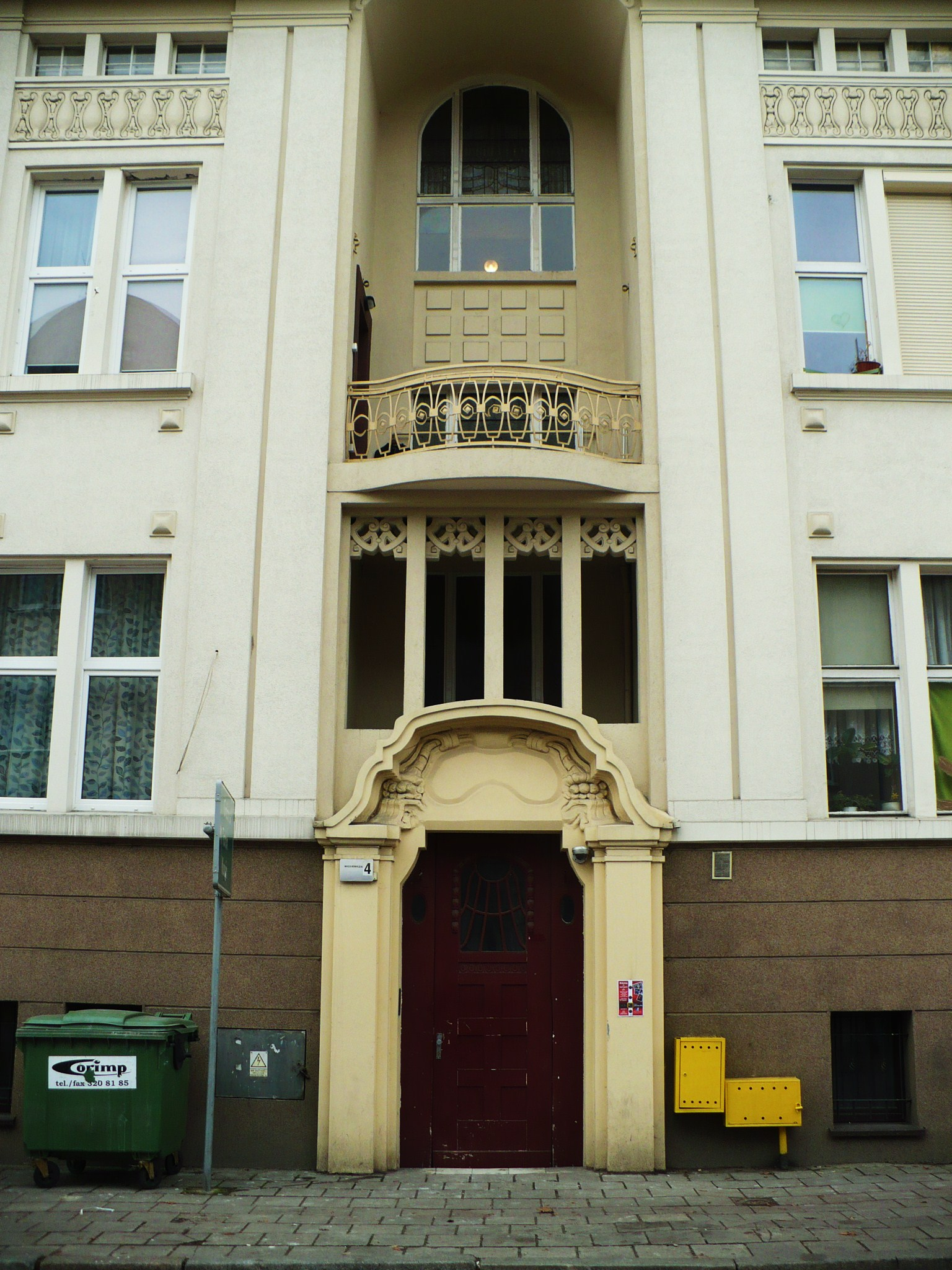
Detail of portal and loggia

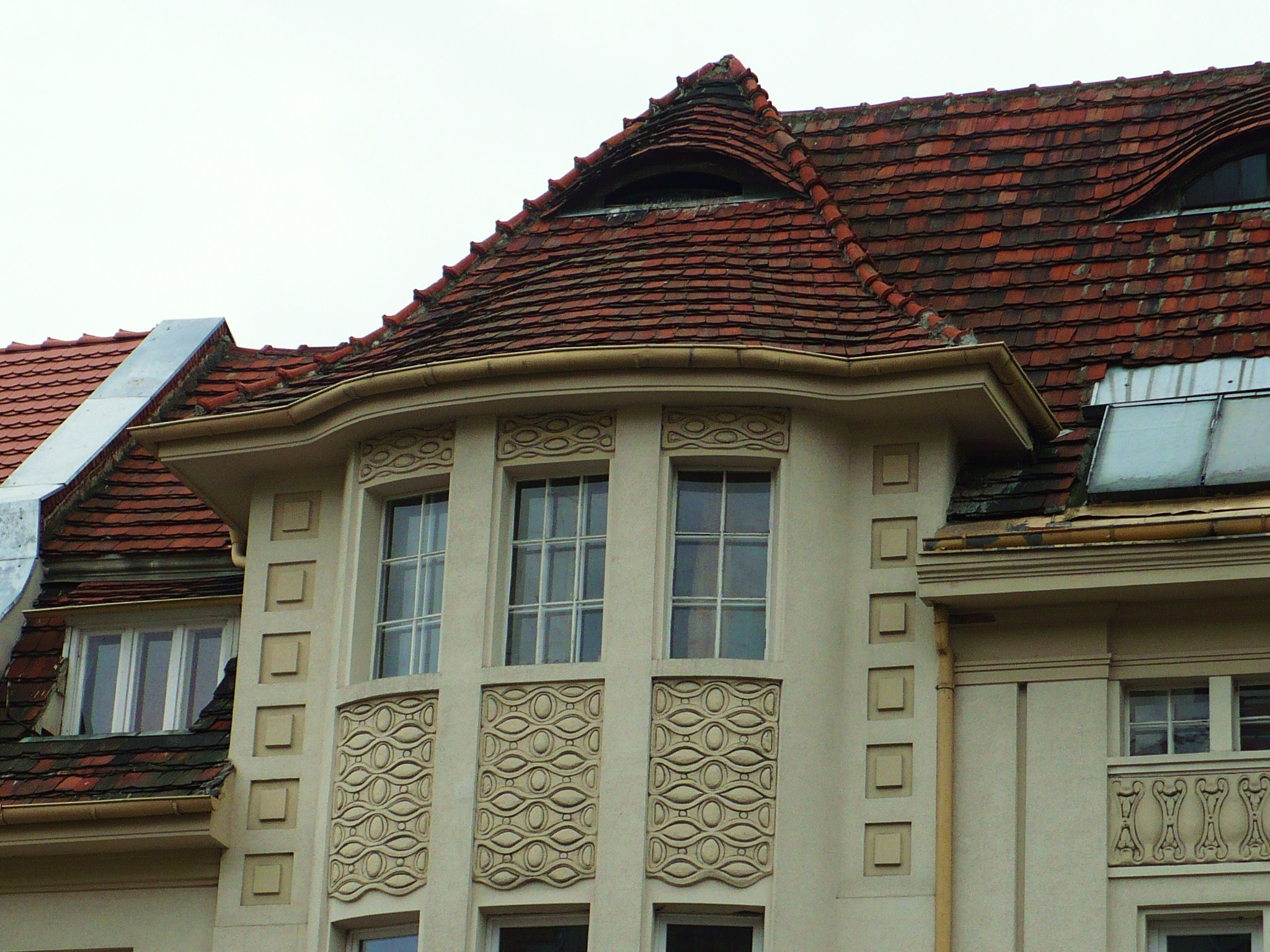
Detail of the gable with eyelid dormer

Paul Sellner Tenement at 10

1905–1907

Art Nouveau

This tenement has been designed and owned by Paul Sellner, an architect who lived in Bromberg's Prussian times. Paul Sellner created representative, metropolitan houses in the style of early modernism located in today's Bydgoszcz downtown, such as the building at Gdanska street 95.

This corner house, one of the oldest in Paderewskiego street, opens a series of frontages characteristic of the elevations on Józef Weyssenhoff Square, with corner bay window and singular wall dormer. One can notice the adorned portal and its Art Nouveau-designed door.

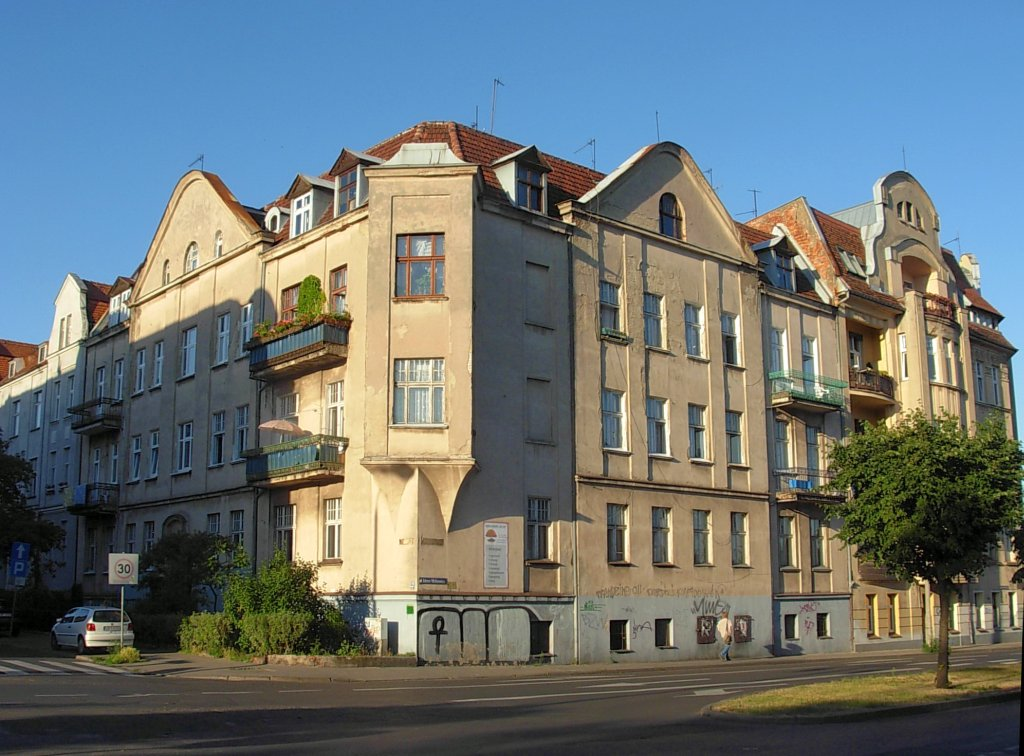
General view of both frontages

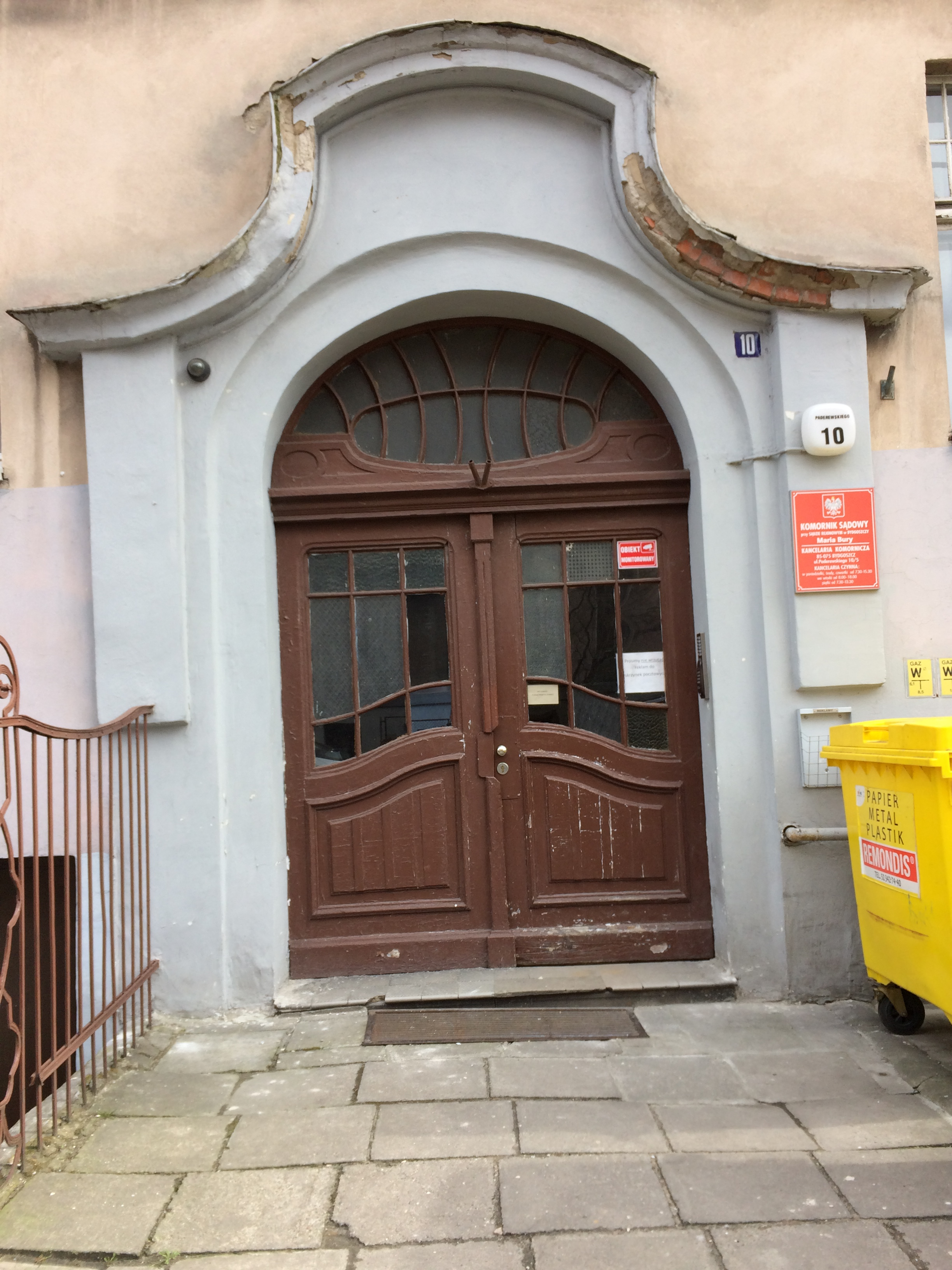
Main gate

Tenement at 11, corner with 10 Zamoyskiego street

1910, by O.M.W. Müller

Art Nouveau

First landlord was a merchant, Julius Lüdtke.

This massive tenement is jammed with Art Nouveau details and motifs, on both facades: pillars on avant-corps decorated with festoons, an exquisite portal adorned with floral motifs up to the oeil-de-boeuf, a round avant-corps topped with a frieze near the corner and as much decoration on the other elevation with bay windows and a second ornamented gate.

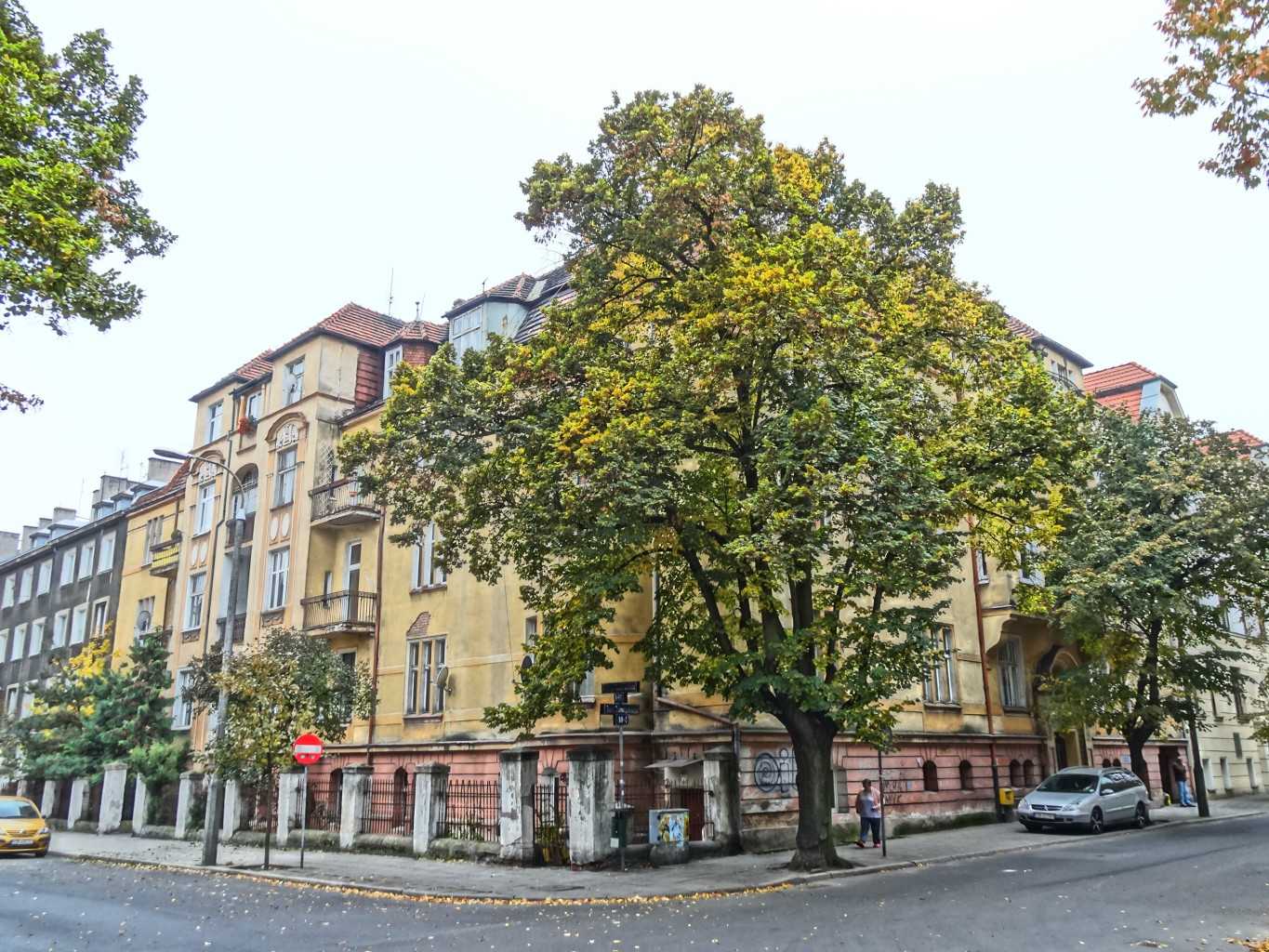
View of both facades

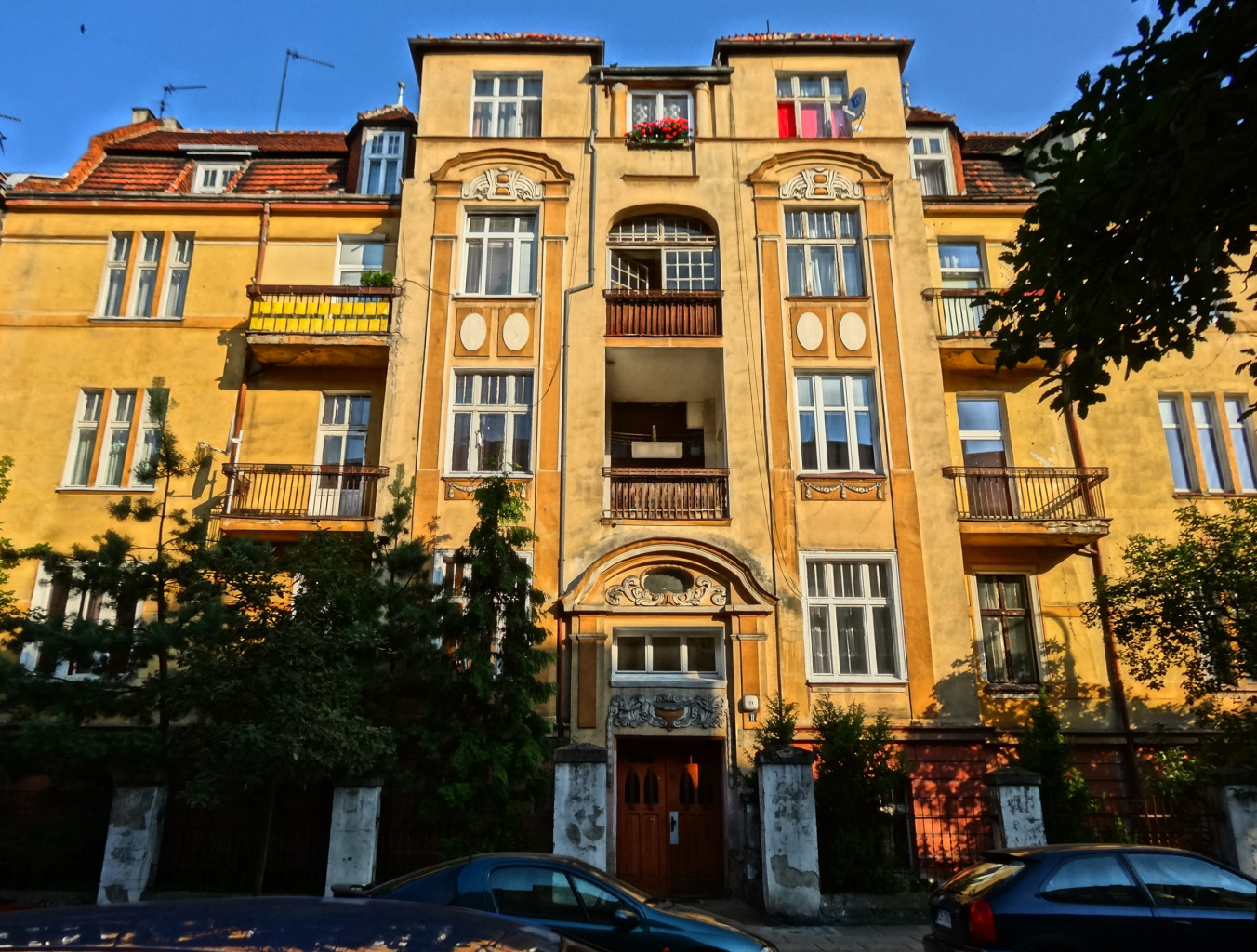
Avant-corps and main entry on Paderewskiego street

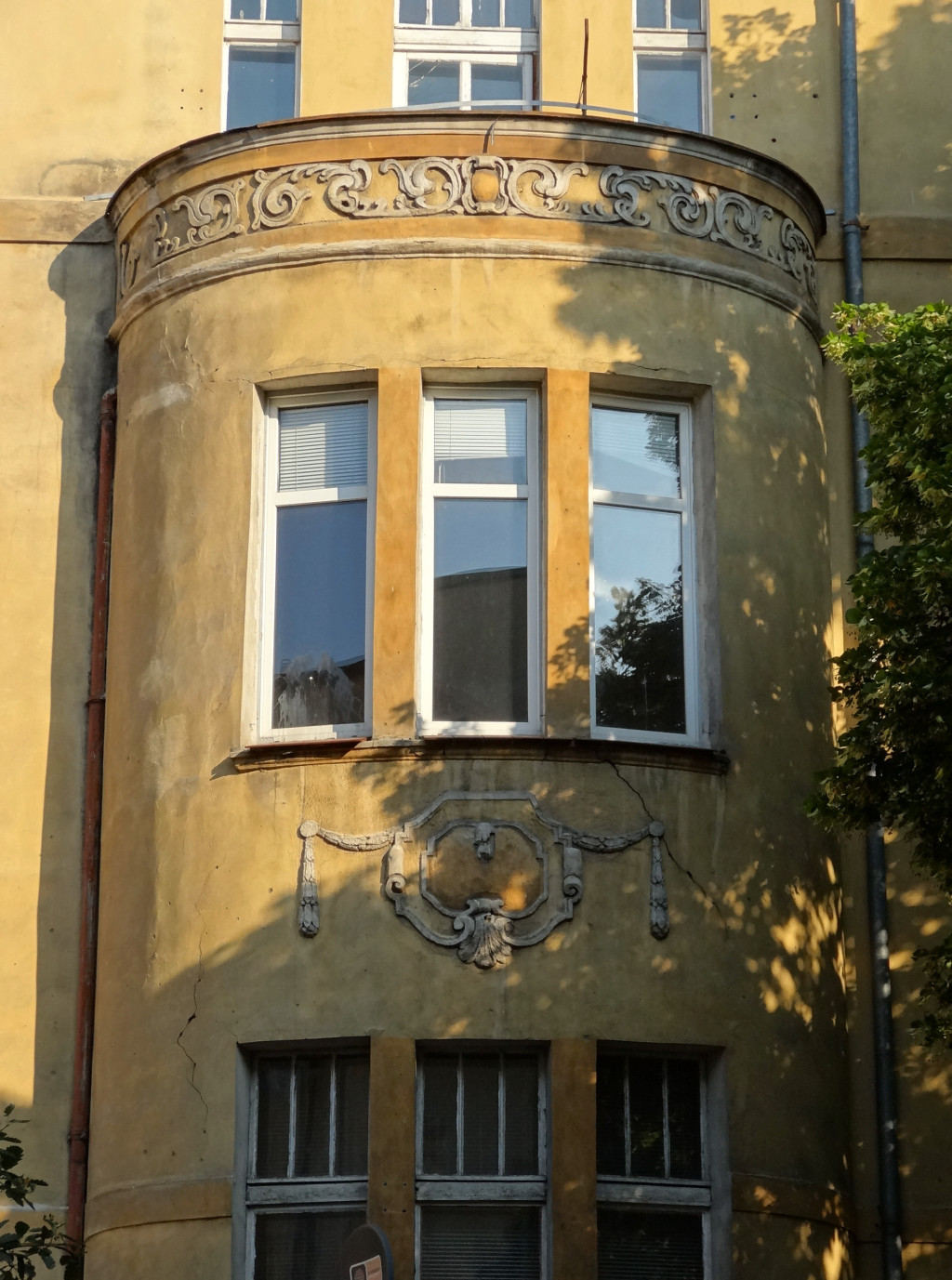
Details of motifs

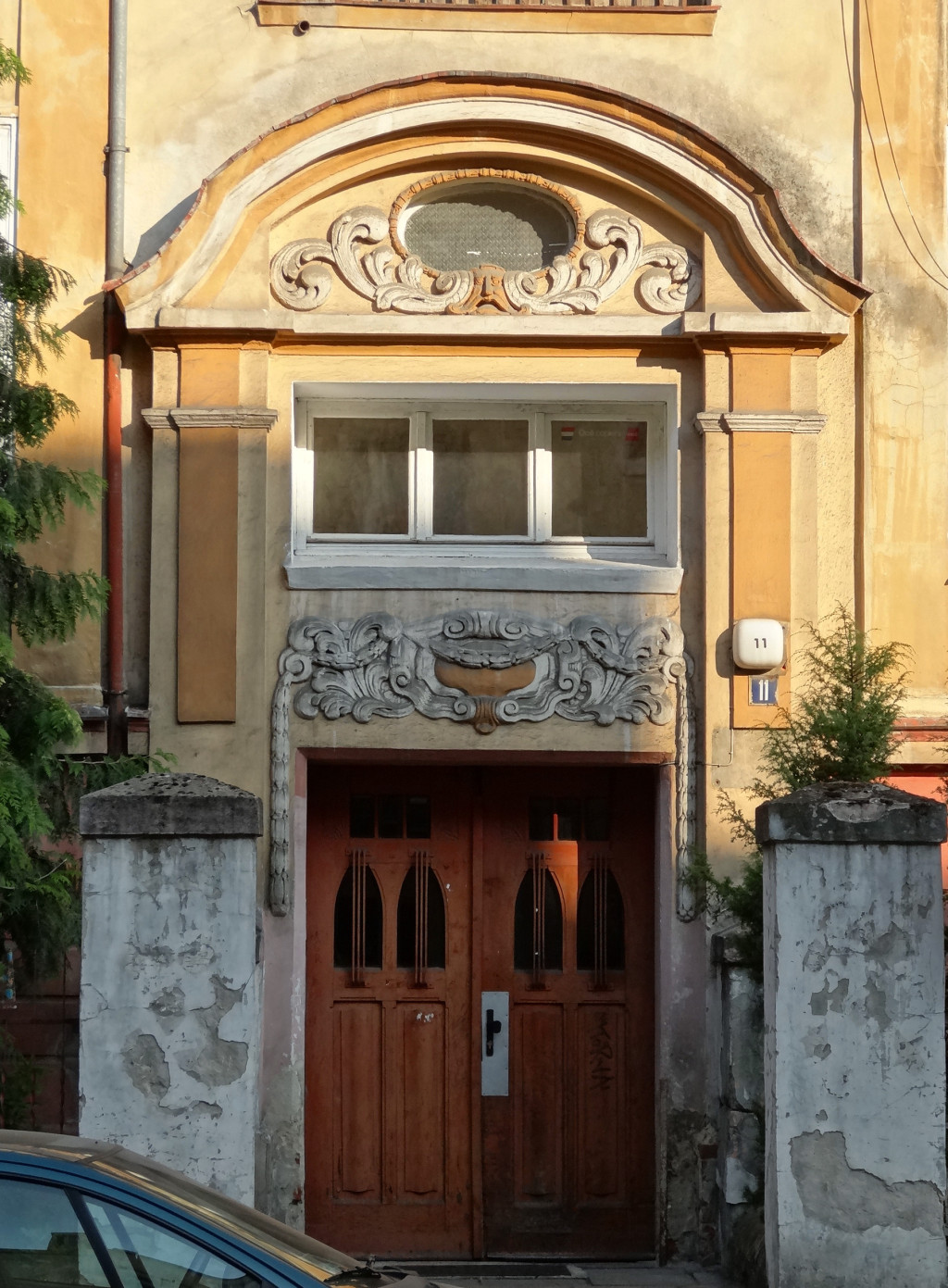
Details of the portal on Paderewksiego street

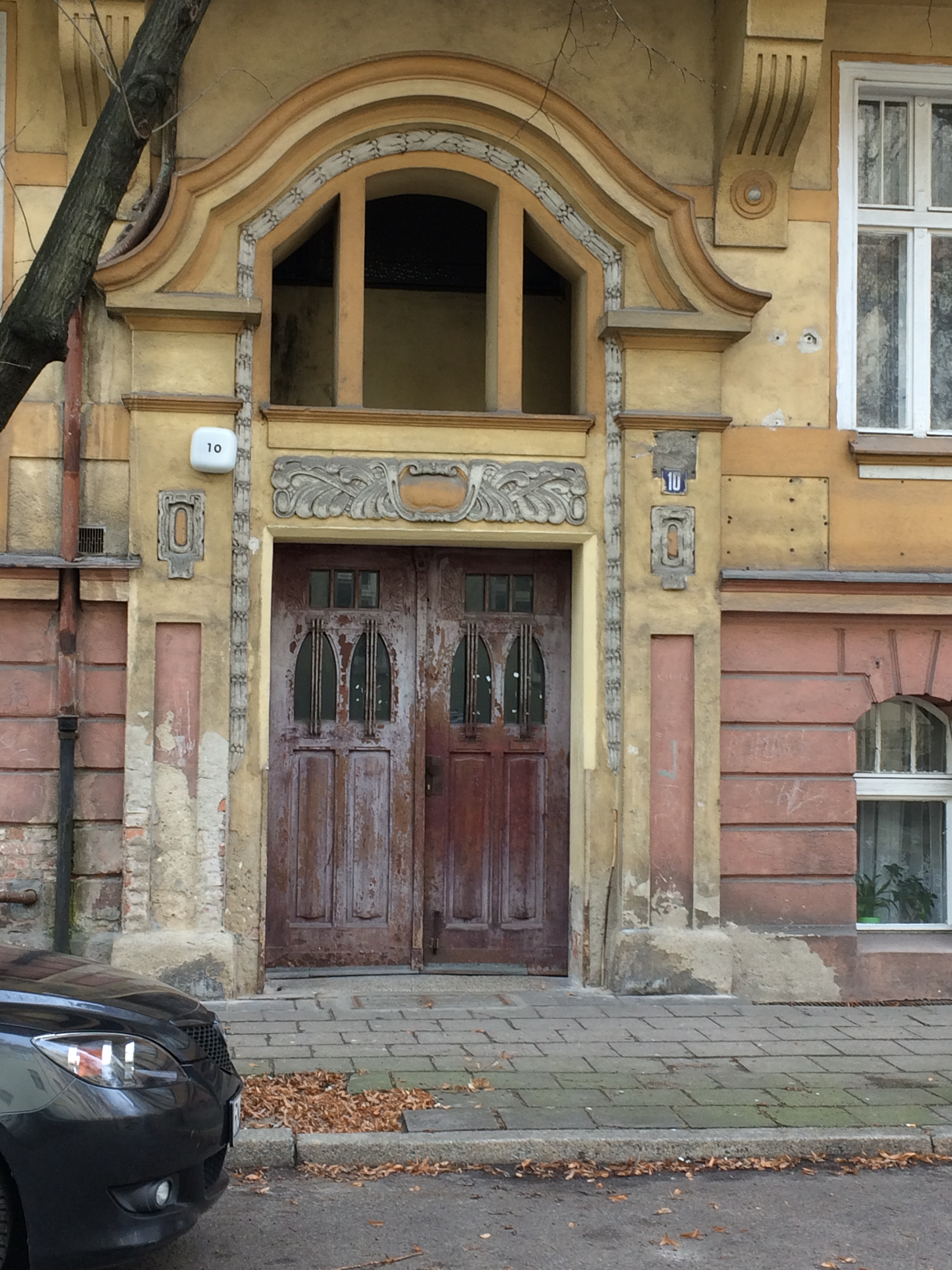
Gate on Zamoyskiego street

Tenement at 12

1909–1910, by Emil Dogs

Eclecticism, Art Nouveau

Initial owner of this building was Max Reschke, a carpenter master, who never lived in. During WWI, Antoni Weynerowski, the shoe factory owner, lived there with his family.

A few architecture elements are still visible on the well-balanced facade, in particular classical festoons below first floor windows. In addition, on the entry portal, two stylized pillars support the lintel topped with Art Nouveau motifs and decoration.

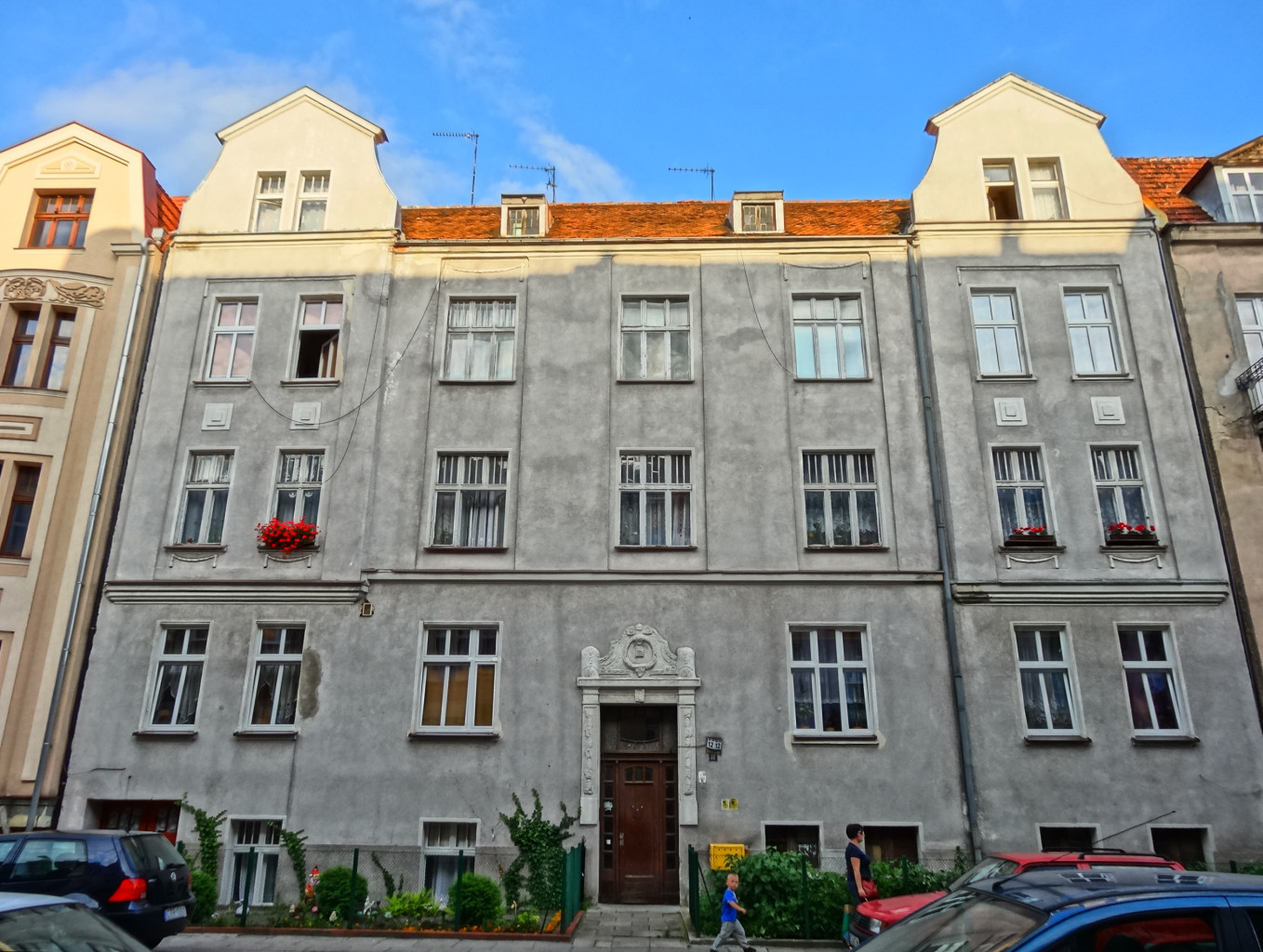
Main frontage on the street

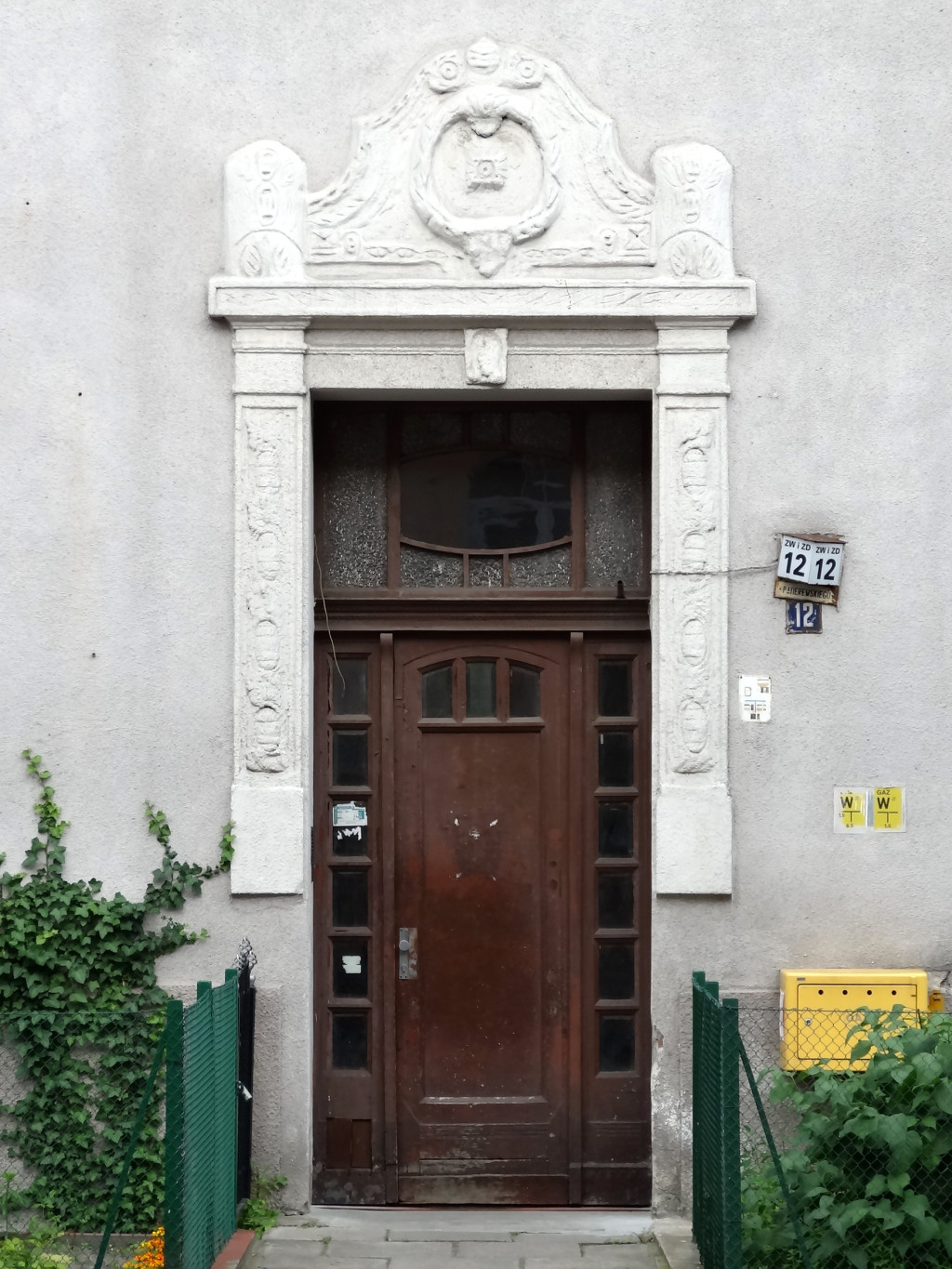
Portal at Nr.12

Tenement at 13, corner with 15 Zamoyskiego street

1910–1915, by Rudolf Kern

Art Nouveau, early Modern architecture

Investor for the project was Emil Heydemann. The first landlord, Ernst Richter, was working as a railway administration secretary.

Both elevations of this large building feature architectural elements transitioning to early modernism style: straight vertical lines are predominant and very few details recall the gone Art Nouveau style (e.g. adorned portals of both elevations, an eyelid dormer or oeil-de-boeuf on top of gable). The tenement has been refurbished in 2017.

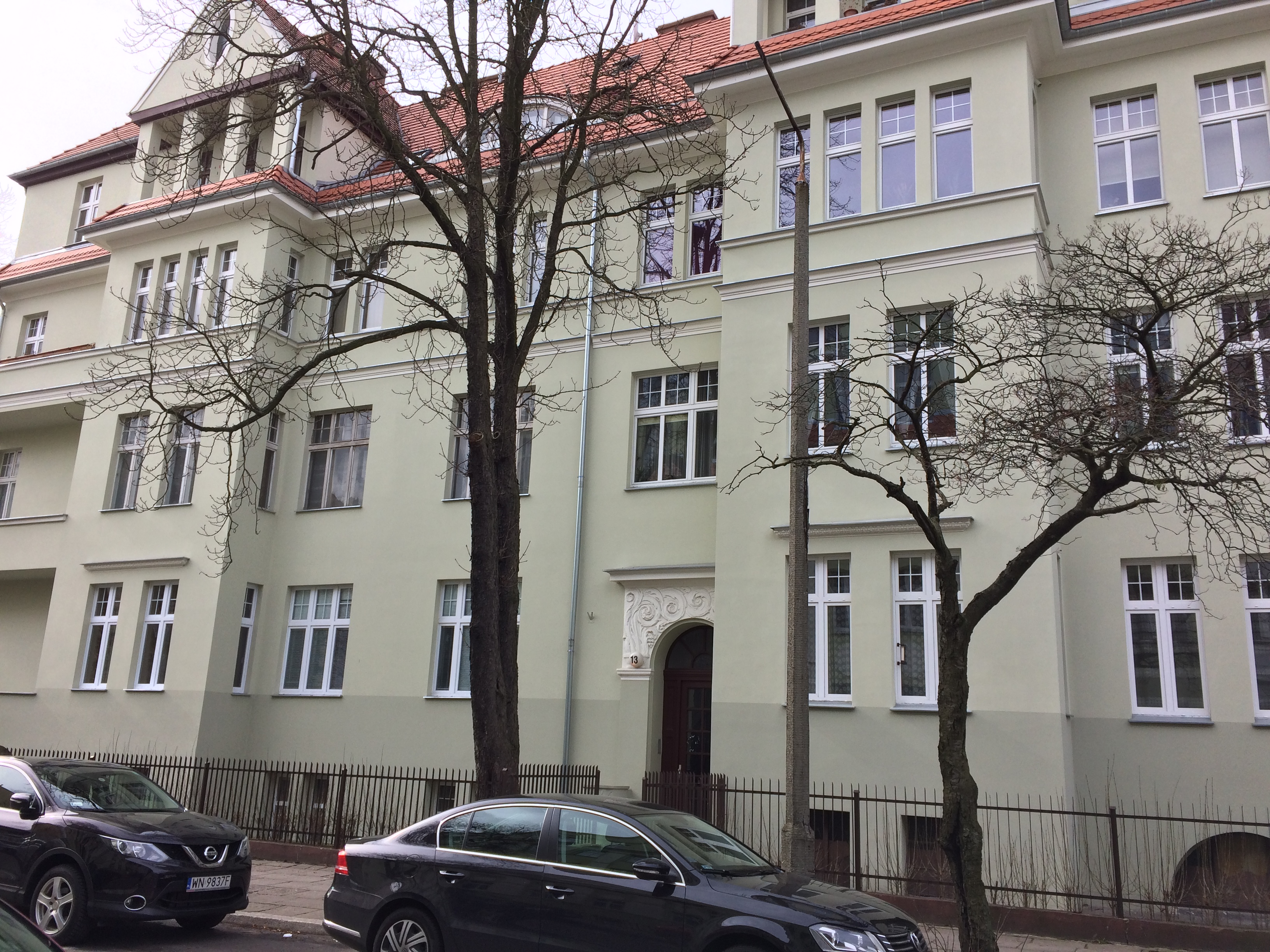
Facade on Paderewskiego street

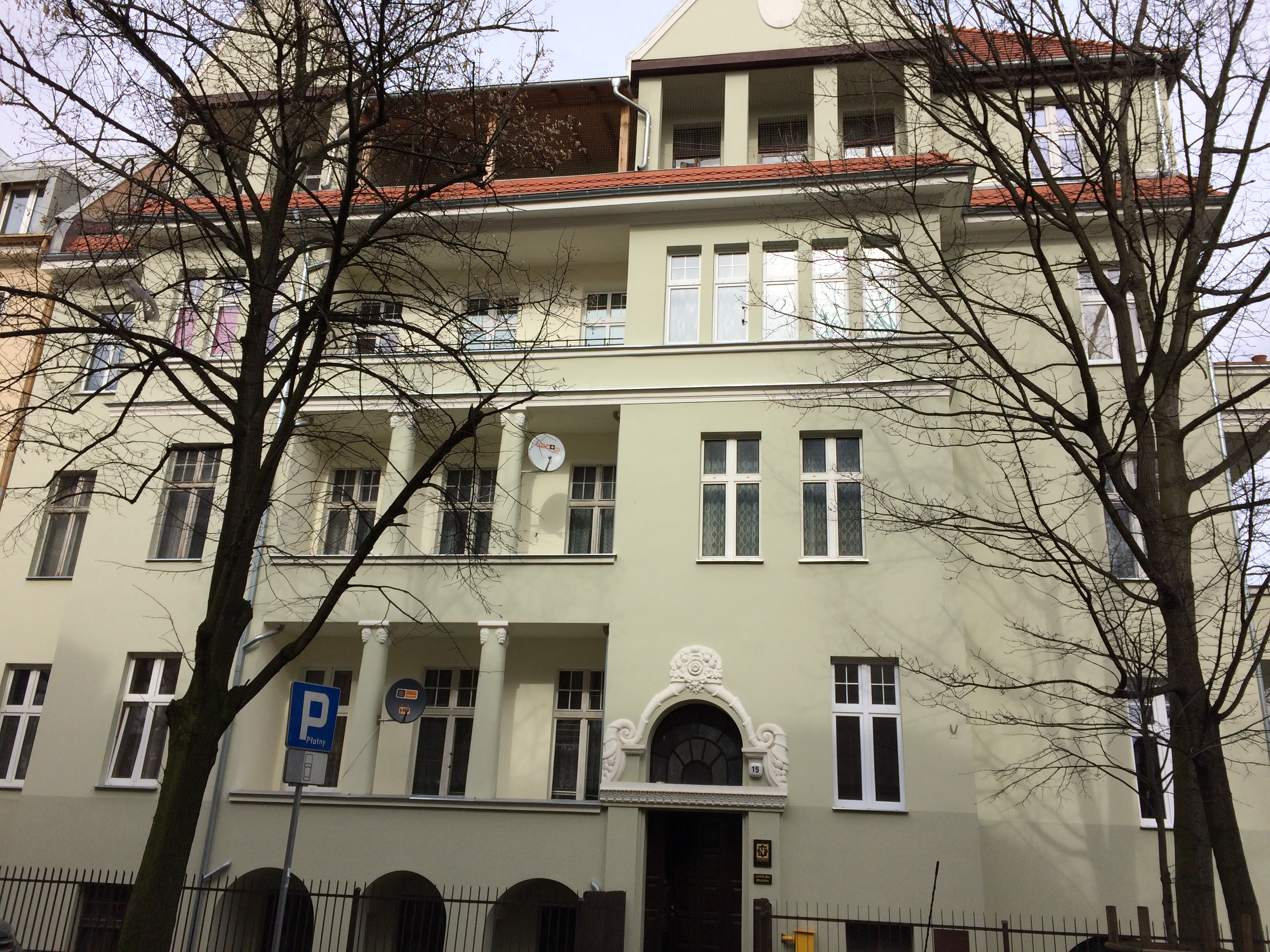
Frontage on Zamoyskiego street

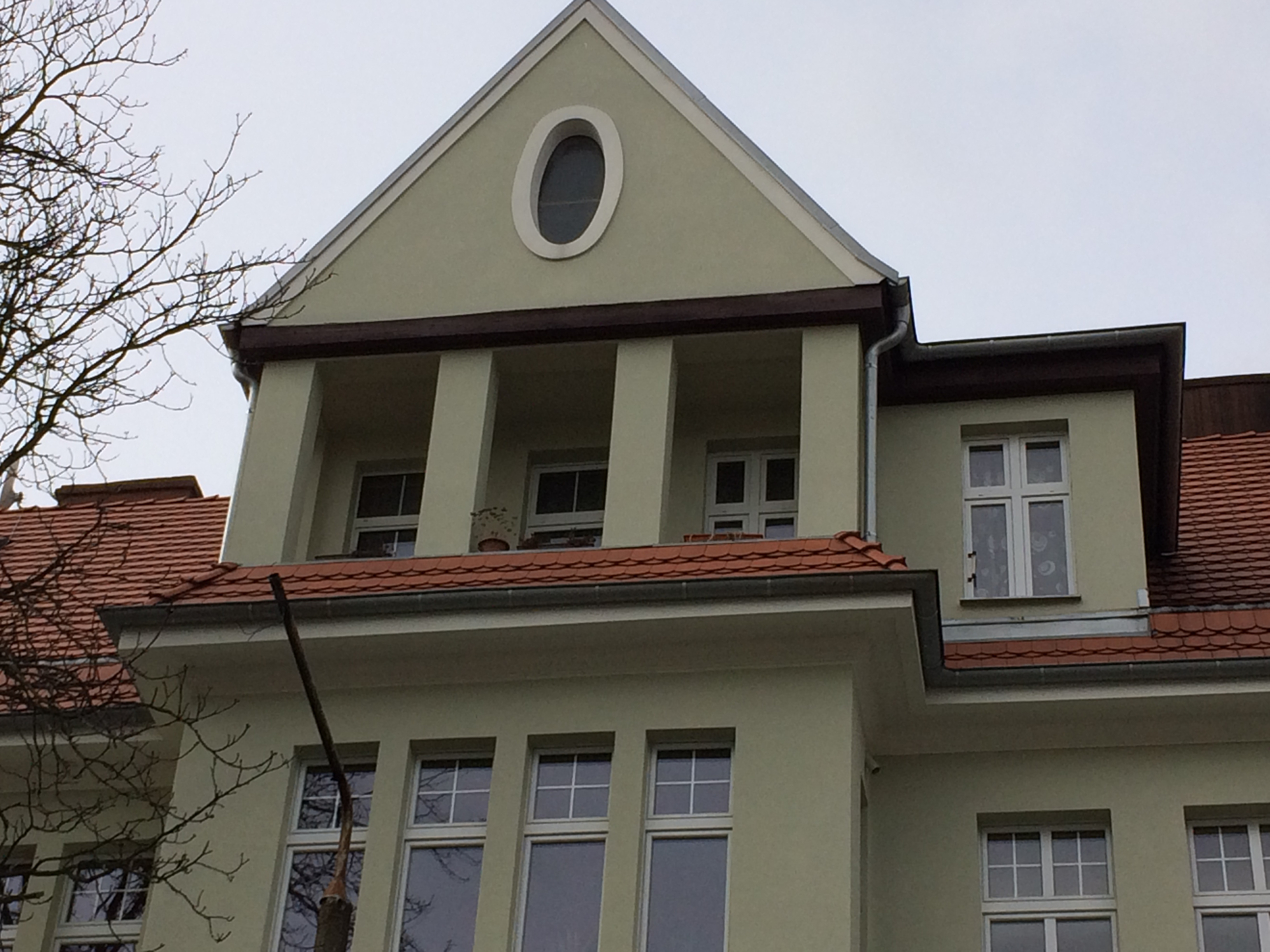
Gable and loggia

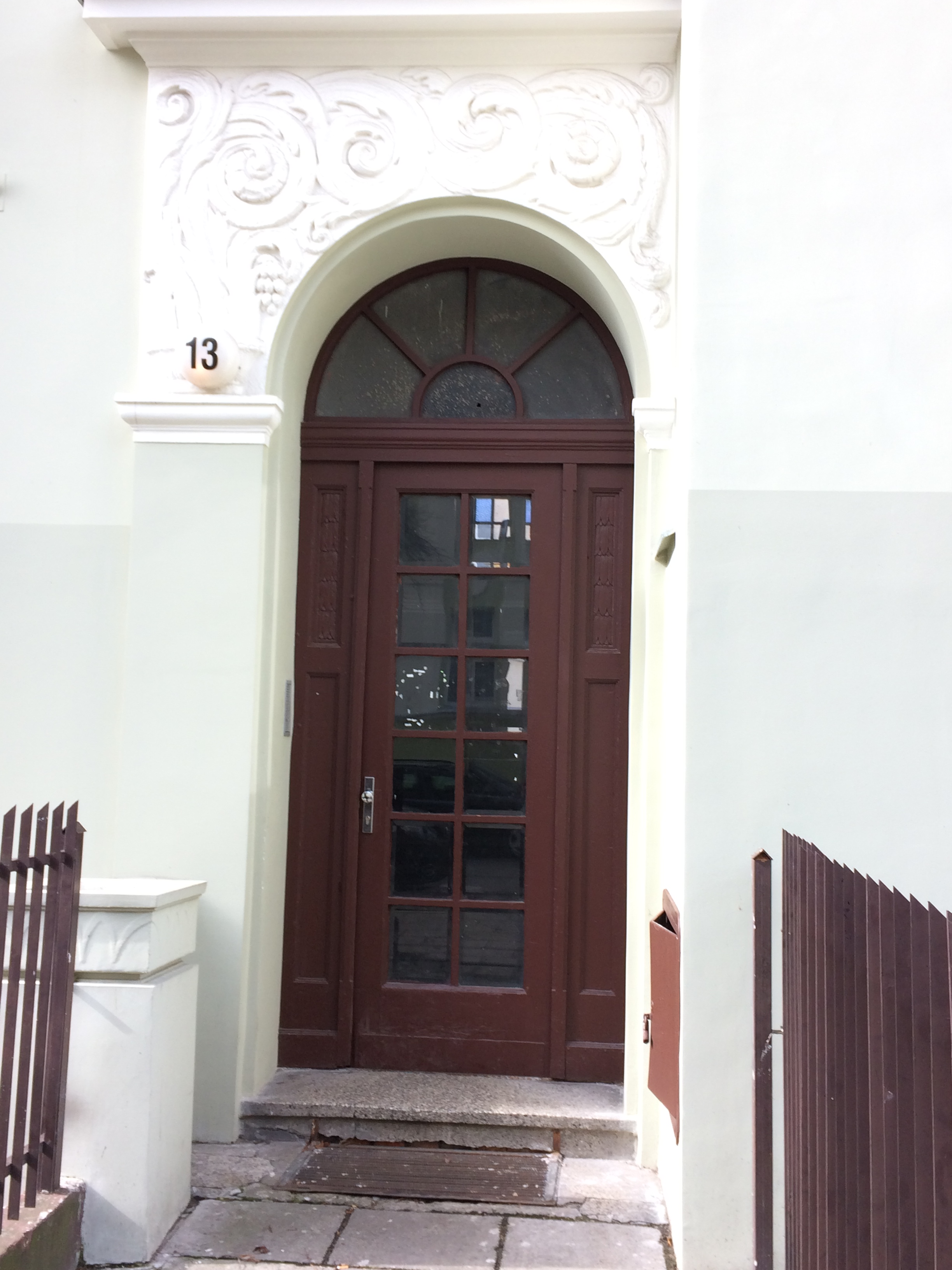
Art Nouveau portal and transom light door

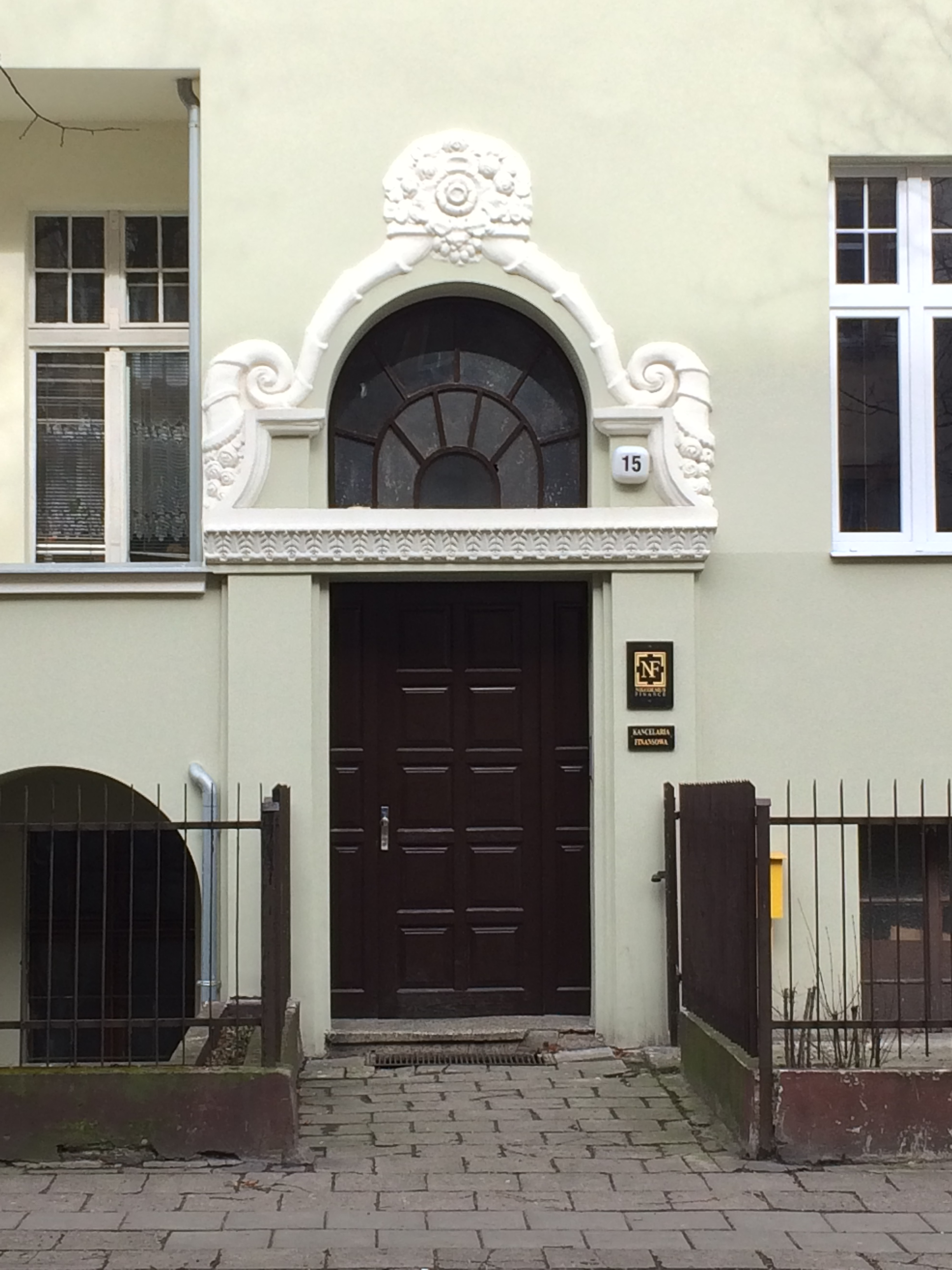
Door on Zamoyskiego street

Tenement at 14

1906, by Goltz brothers

Late Eclecticism, elements of Modernism

The building dates from 1906 and is notable because of one of its past tenants, Józef Paderewski. In the 1930s, Józef, brother of the more famous Ignacy Jan Paderewski, lived there. He was then working as a professor at both the Female High School of Humanities and Bydgoszcz Music Conservatoire.

The overall shape mirrors the abutting tenements (Nr.12 and 16). In the one hand, the architectural style leans to modernism, with vertical lines and fewer motifs. There are several adorned cartouches, pillars on both bay windows and floral and curved ornamentation. During the last renovation of the frontage in 2009, a new fence was specially handcrafted by a blacksmith.

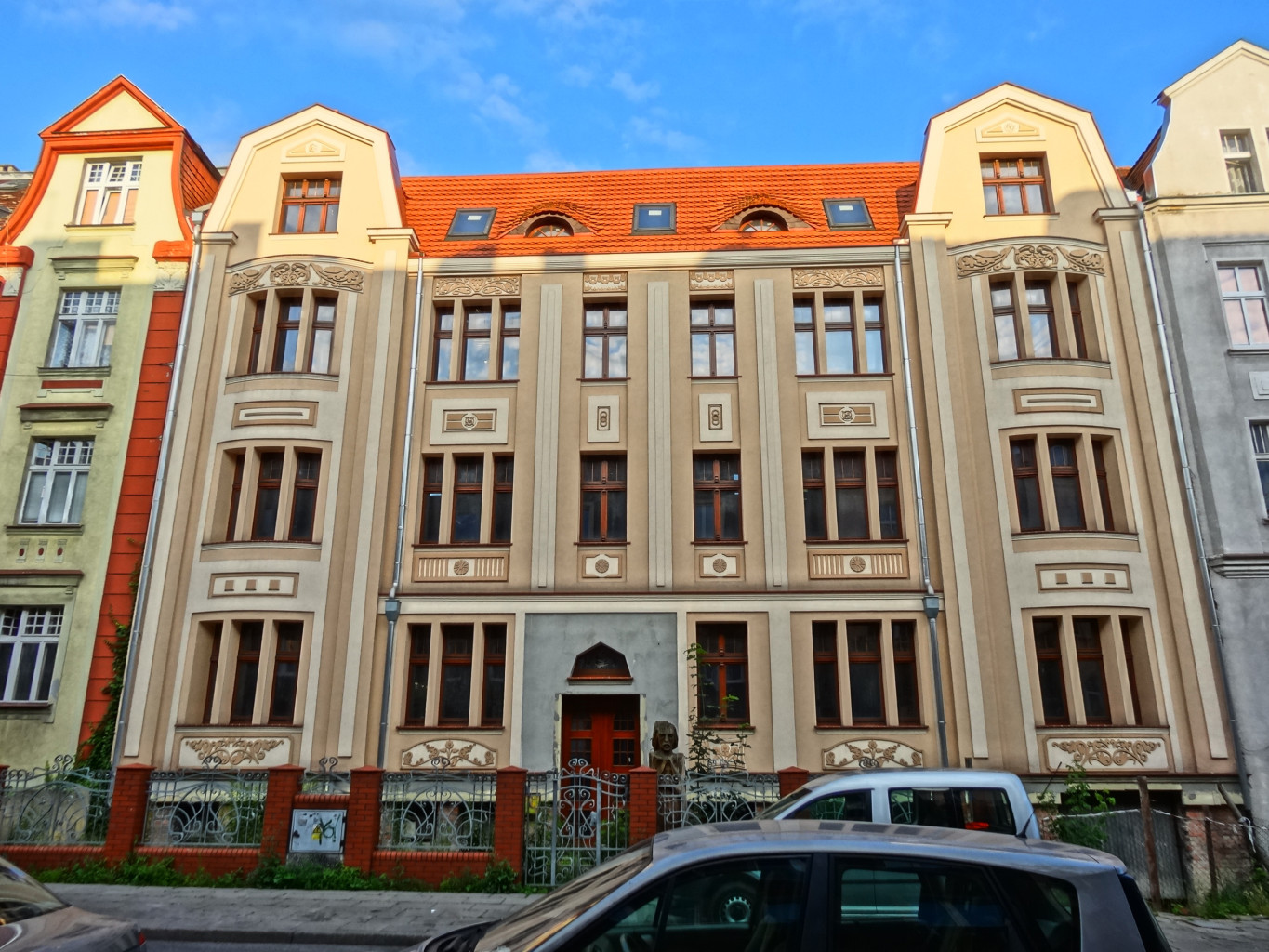
Elevation on the street

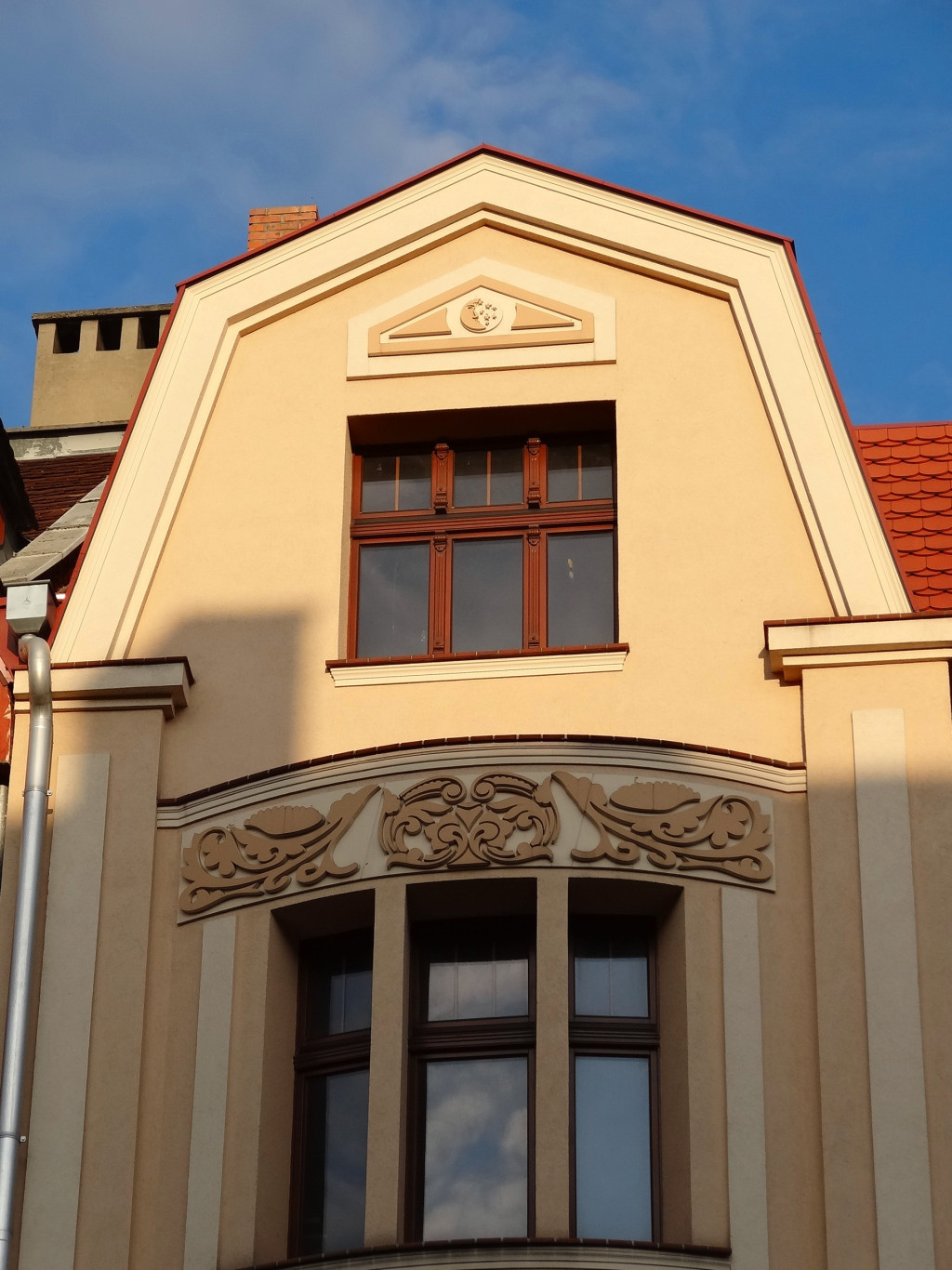
Detail of a bay window

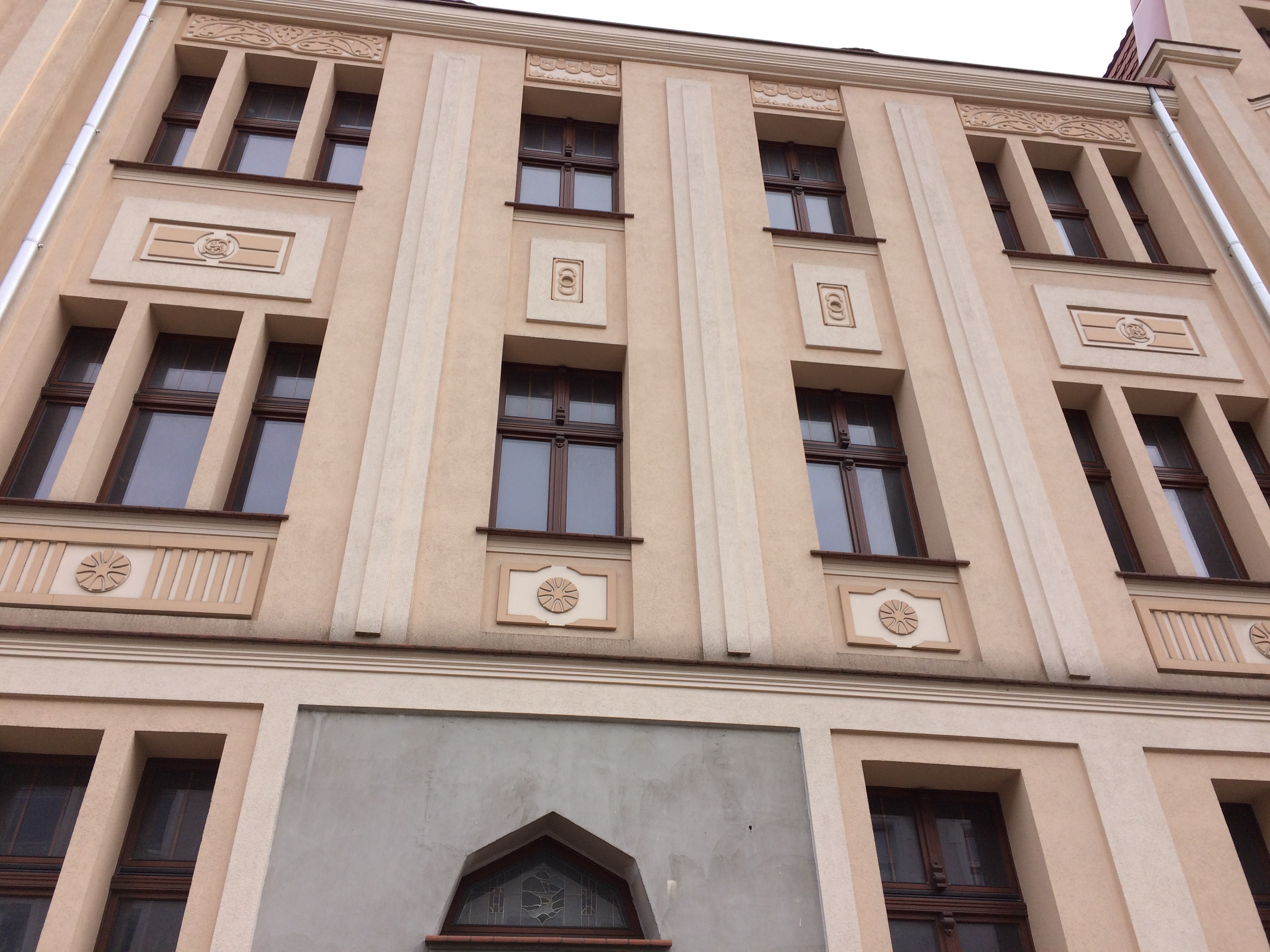
Facade ornamentation

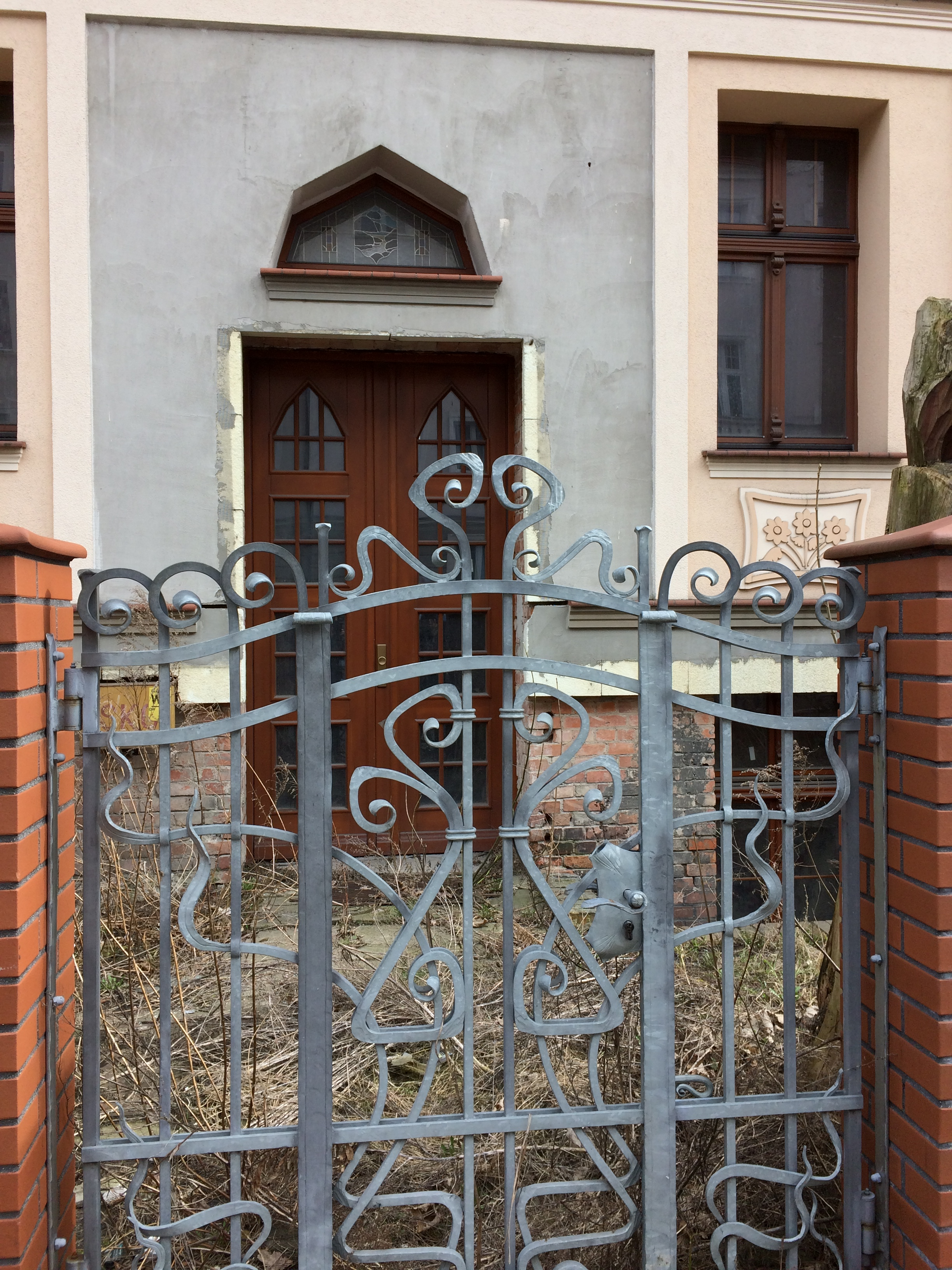
Entry fence and gate

Tenement at 16

1909–1910, by Leo Ficht

Early Modernism

Leo Ficht was also the funder of the construction.

Though intensively decorated, the main elevation features early modern elements through various geometric shapes, very few curves and the global trend for displaying vertical stretched lines. Portal motifs, gable details and some floral festoons betray the non-long-ago former eclectic style.

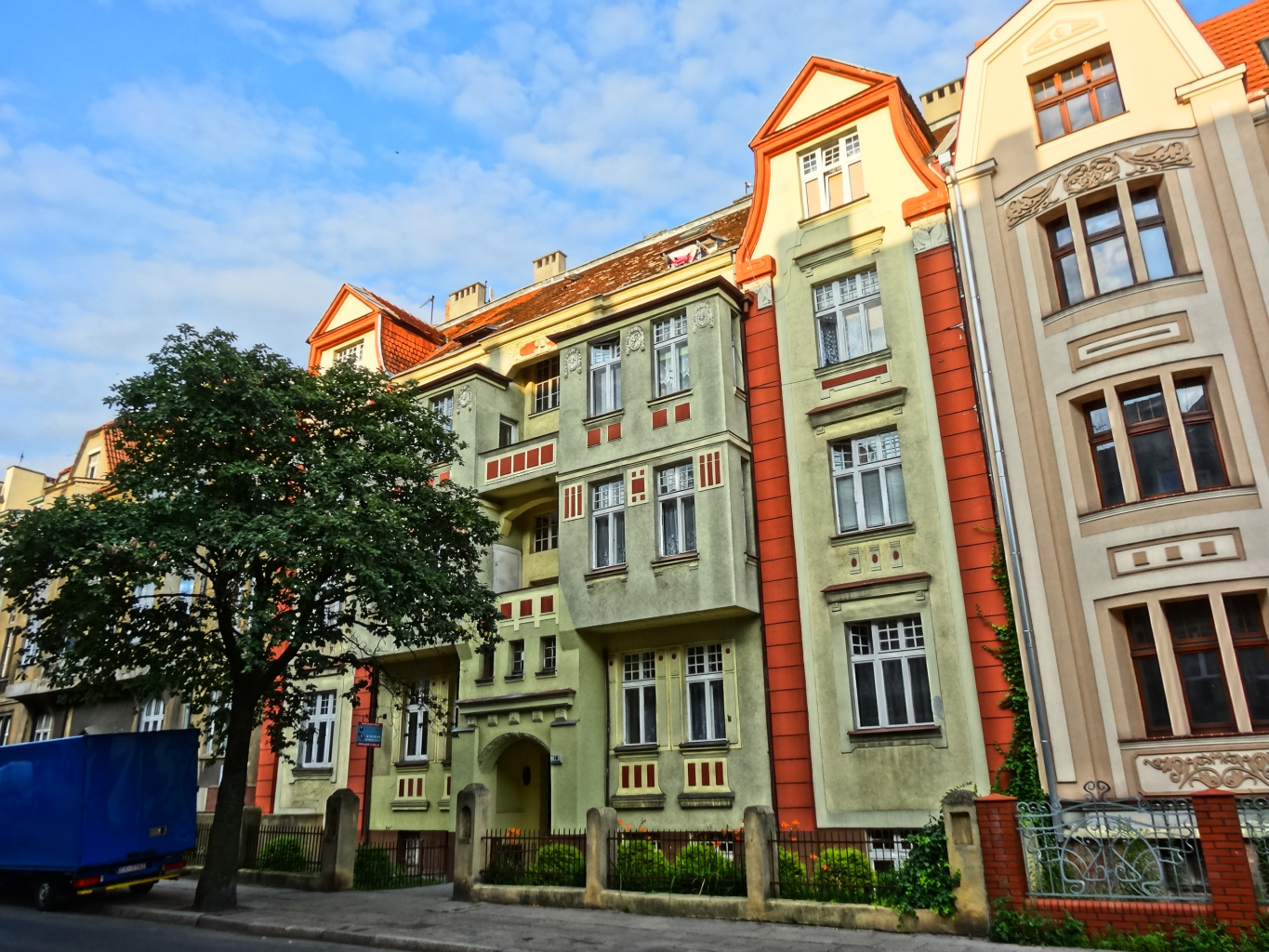
Main elevation from the street

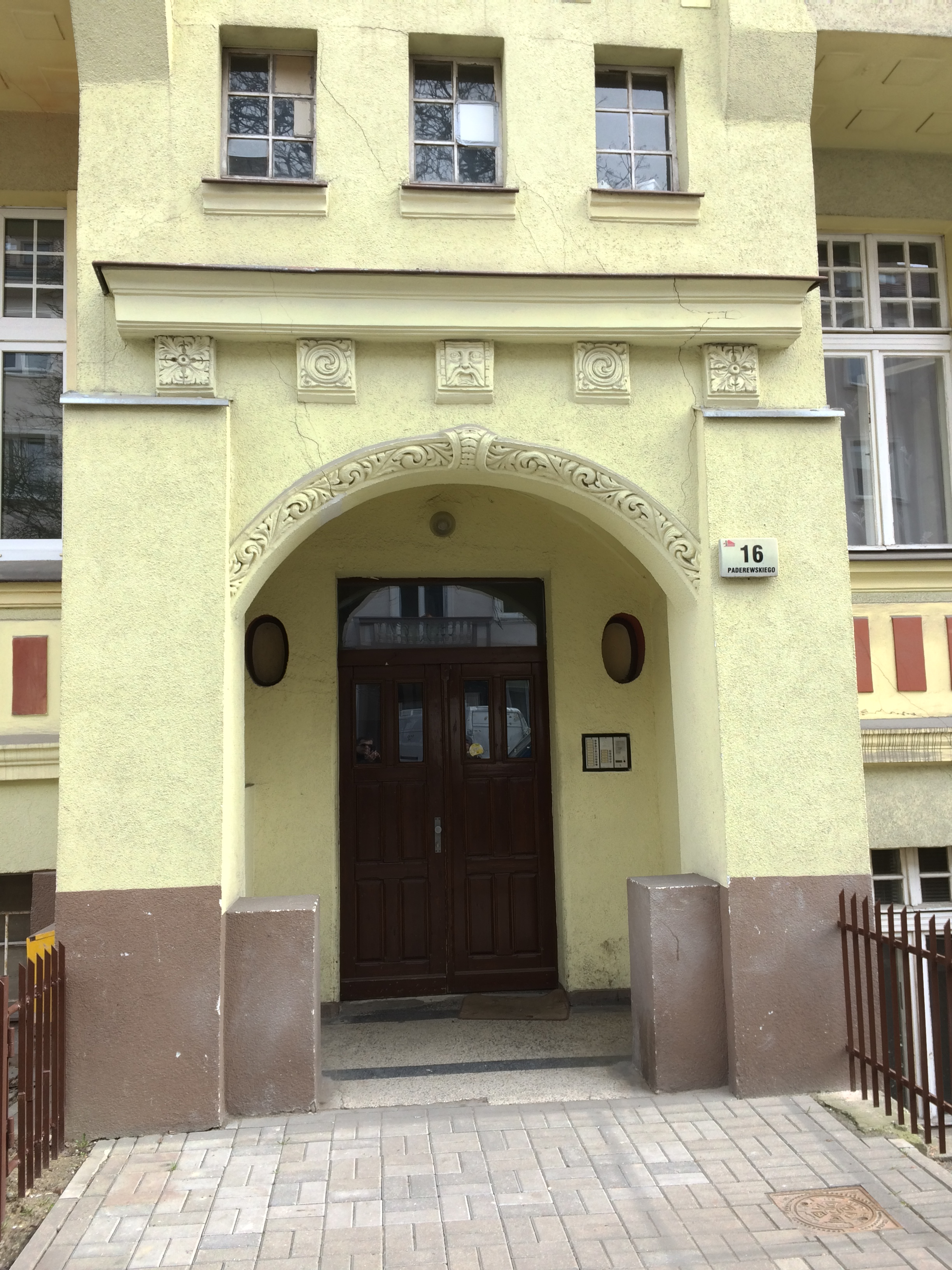
Entry portal and gate

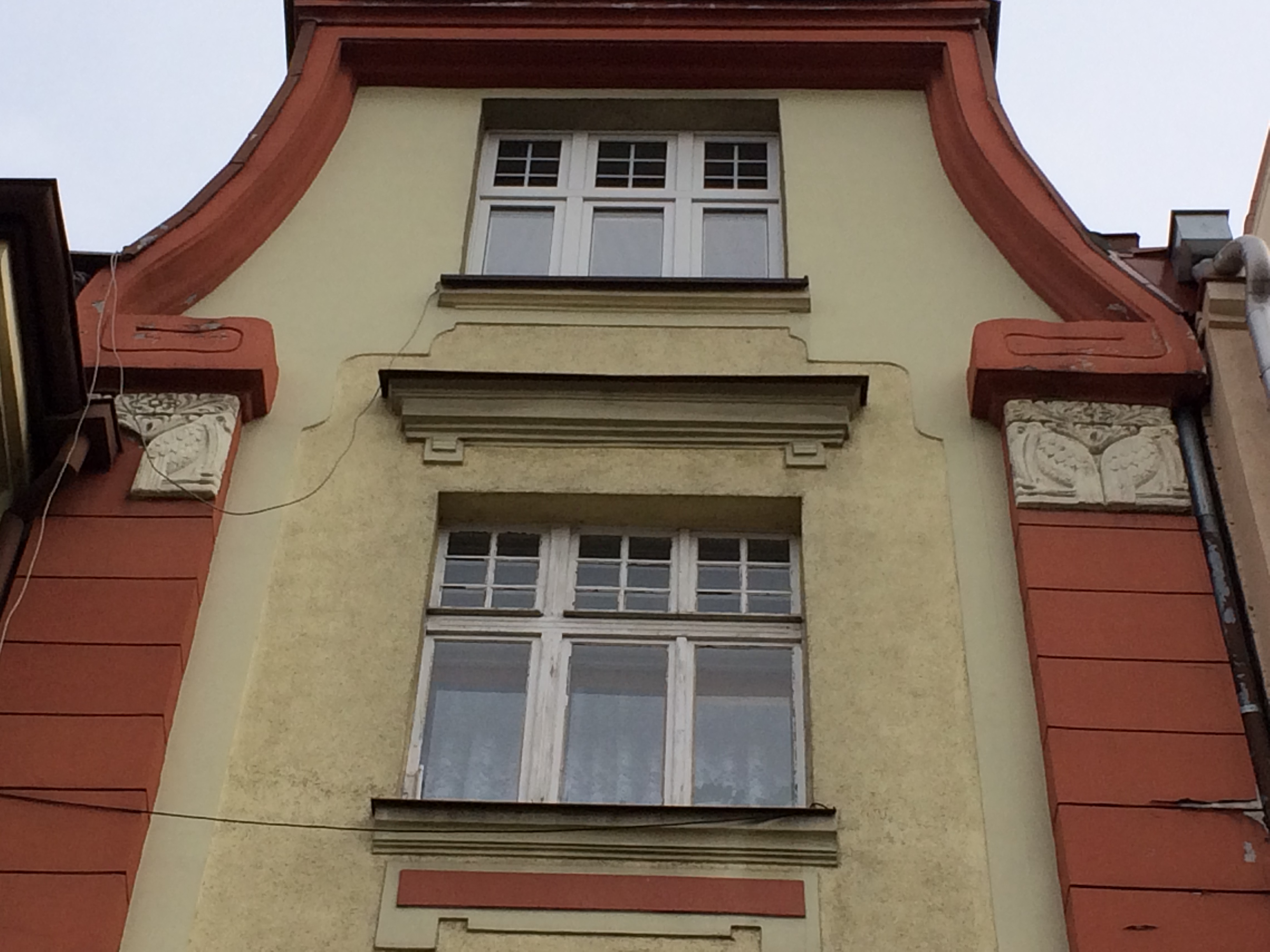
Gable and pillar tops

Tenement at 18

1911, by Paul Sellner

Late Eclecticism, elements of Modernism

Leo Ficht, investor of Nr.16, also funded this tenement. The building has been owned by Ludwig Sibilski, an army tailor. His family kept the ownership till the 1930s.

Like many of the neighbouring tenements, the architectural style shifts to modernism, while keeping patches of eclectic details: the entry gate flanked by pillars and topped by a tympanum, balconies and bay windows adorned by cartouche, or symbolic group of motifs between windows.

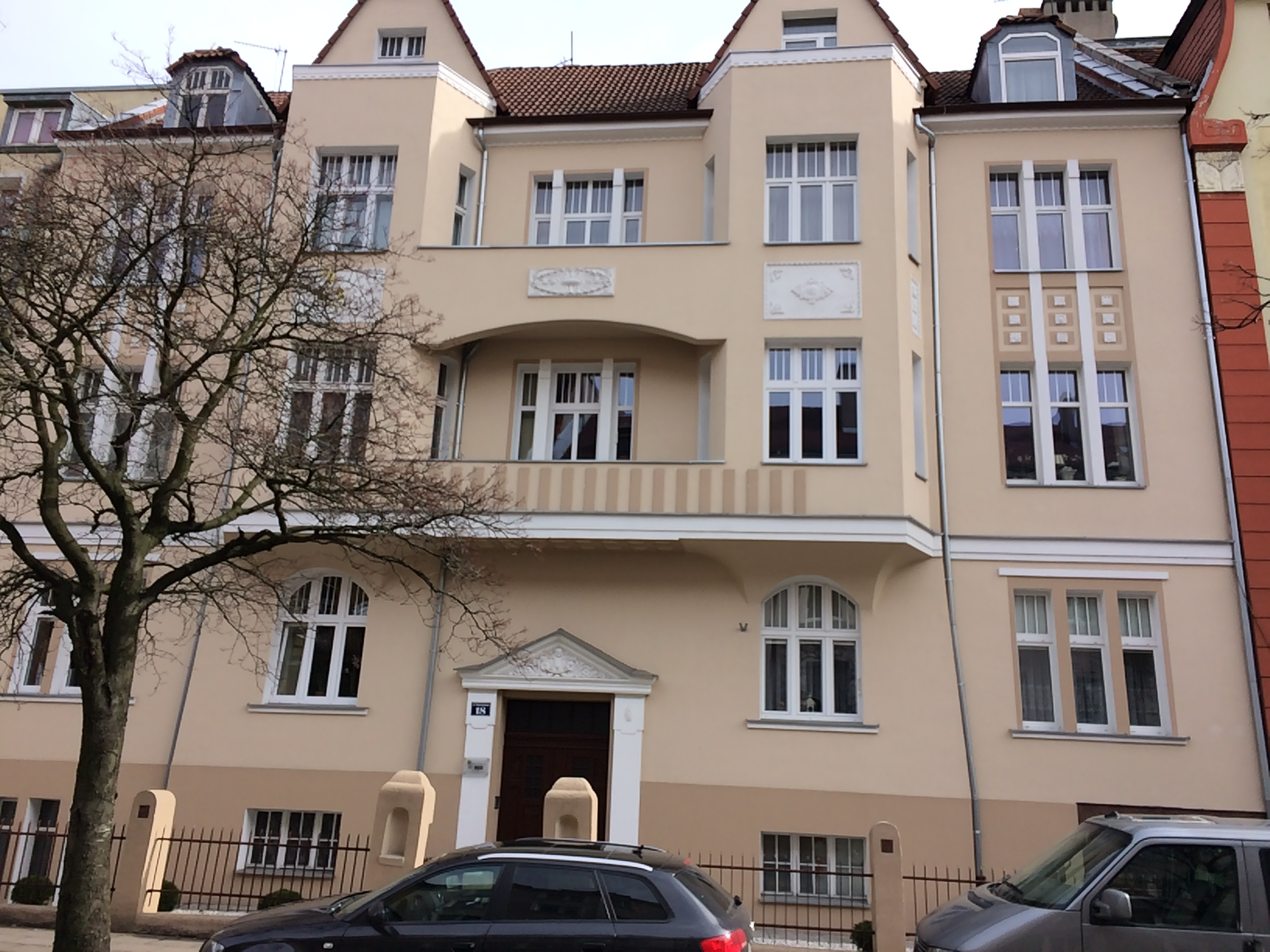
Main frontage

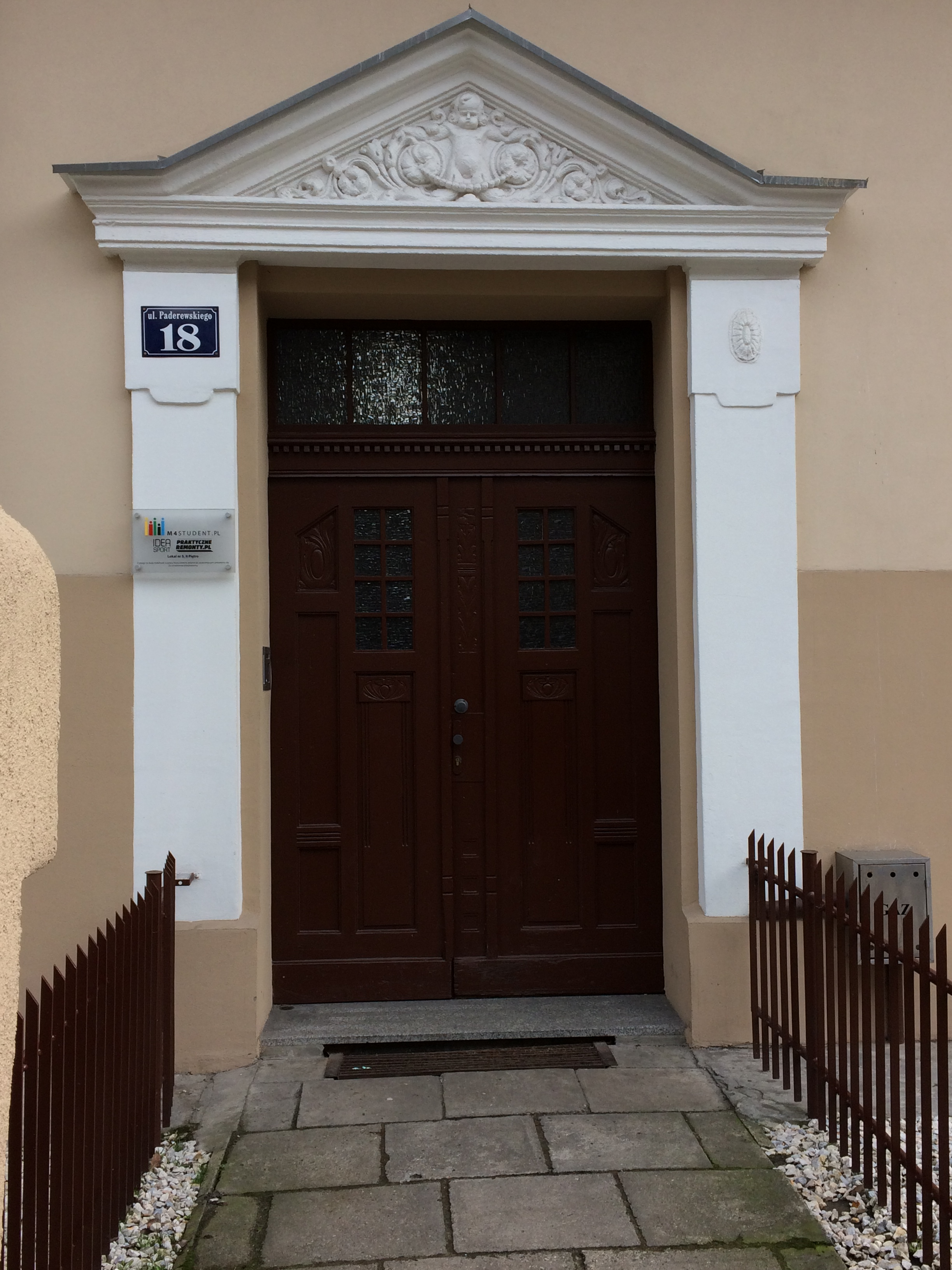
Ornamented gate and its pediment

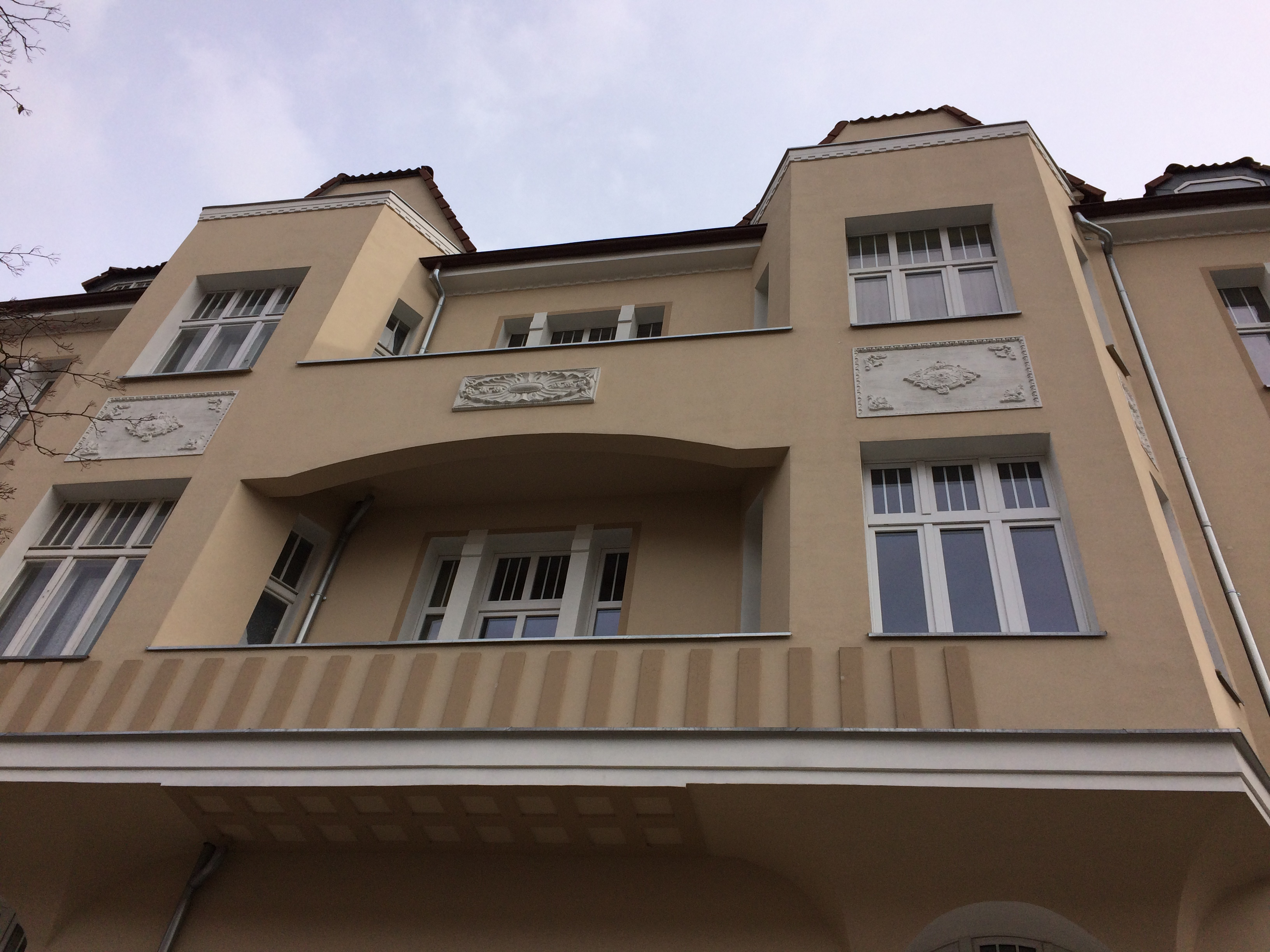
Balconies details

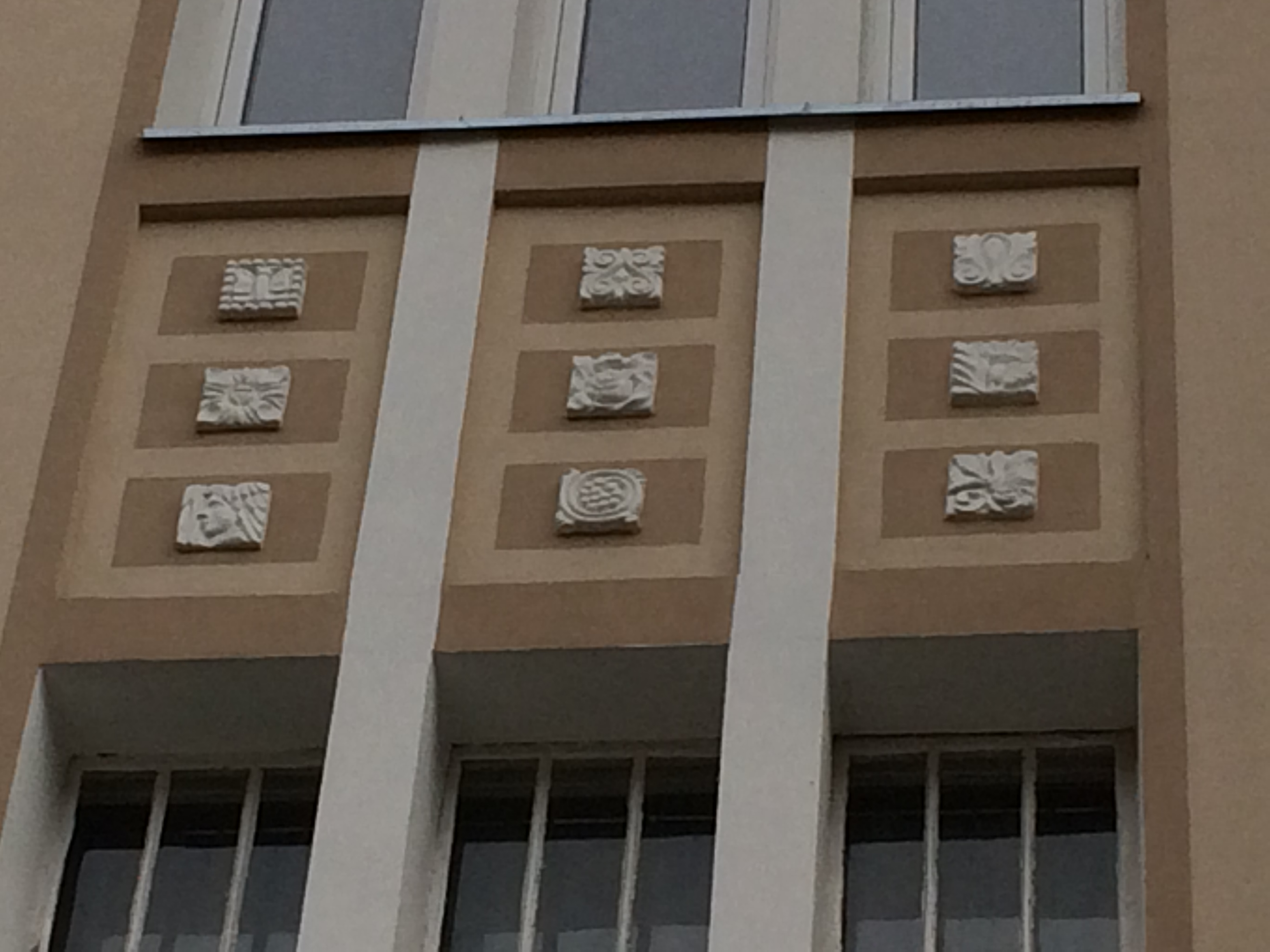
Motifs

Tenement at 21

1910, by Emil Heydemann

Early Modernism, Art Nouveau elements

Located when erected at Schillerstraße 43, the first landlord, Otto Tarnow, a post office secretary, has never inhabited there. The edifice was mainly used for renting purposes, housing up to 29 tenants in the 1930s

Slimmer than the surrounding buildings, the edifice would deserve a refurbishment. However, one can still make out last remnants of Art Nouveau influence: cartouche filled with floral or vegetal motifs, a terrace on top of the avant-corps, or the curved wall dormer pierced by an oeil-de-boeuf.

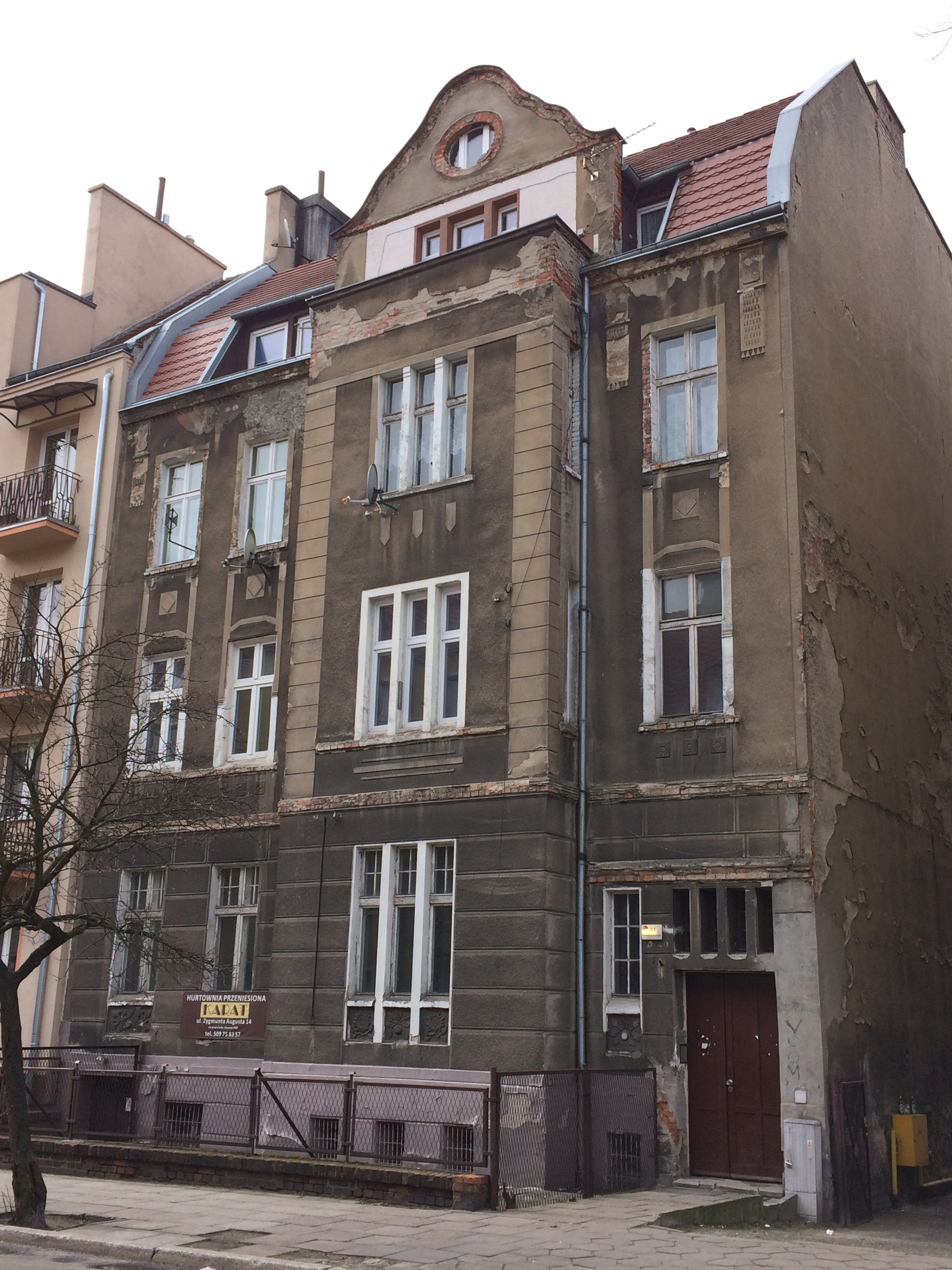
Frontage on the street

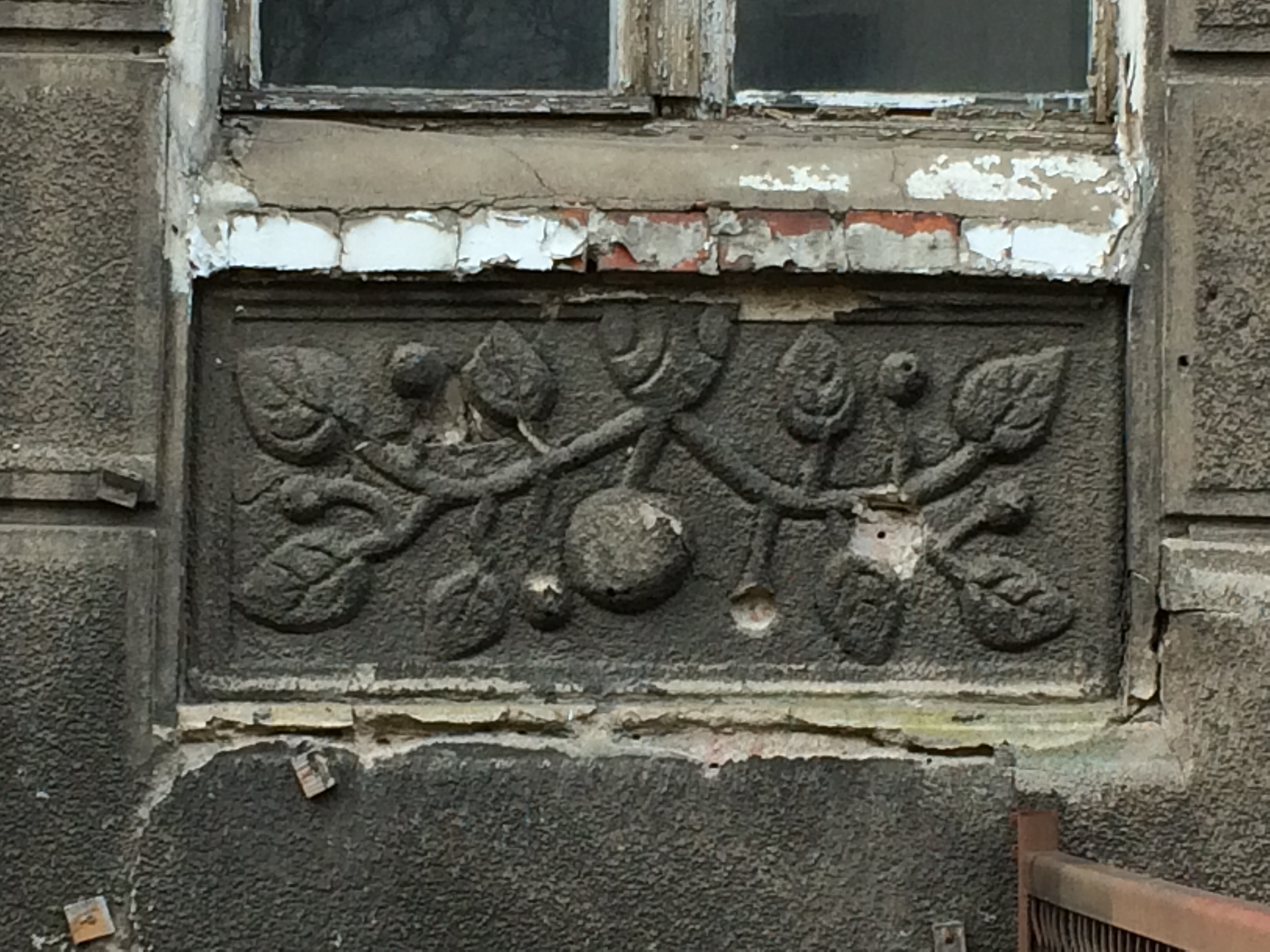
Vegetal motif in a cartouche

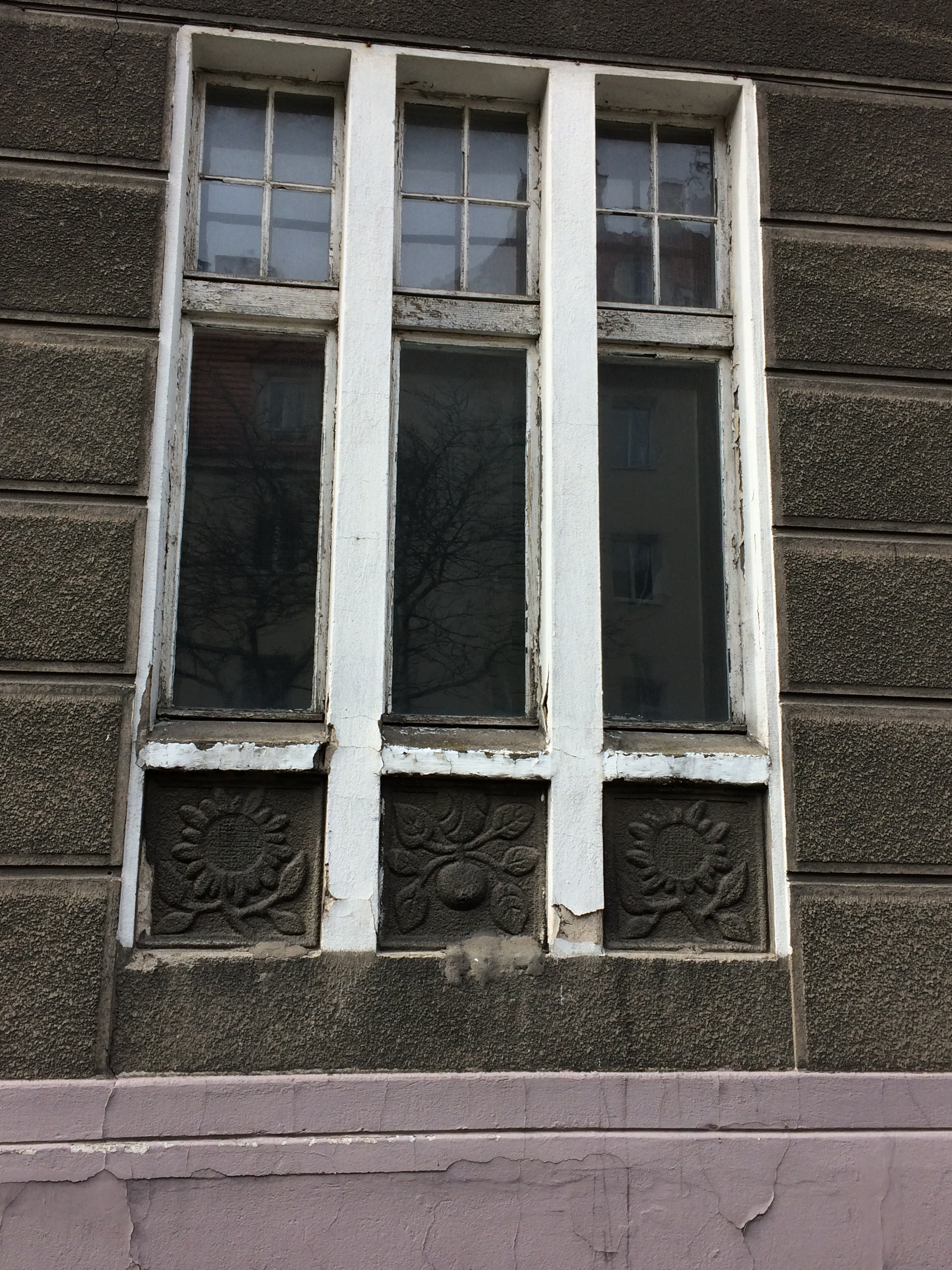
Window with Art Nouveau decoration

Tenement at 22, corner with Zamoyskiego street

1912–1914, by Victor Petrikowski

Early Modernism

Built at the eve of WWI, the tenement's first keeper was Otto Möller, an assistant in railway construction business, who dwelt there till the 1930s.

The edifice is one of the first in the street without any Art Nouveau detail, however tiny it may be. The main facade follows without reservation early modernist style. The ensemble was renovated at the end of 2016.

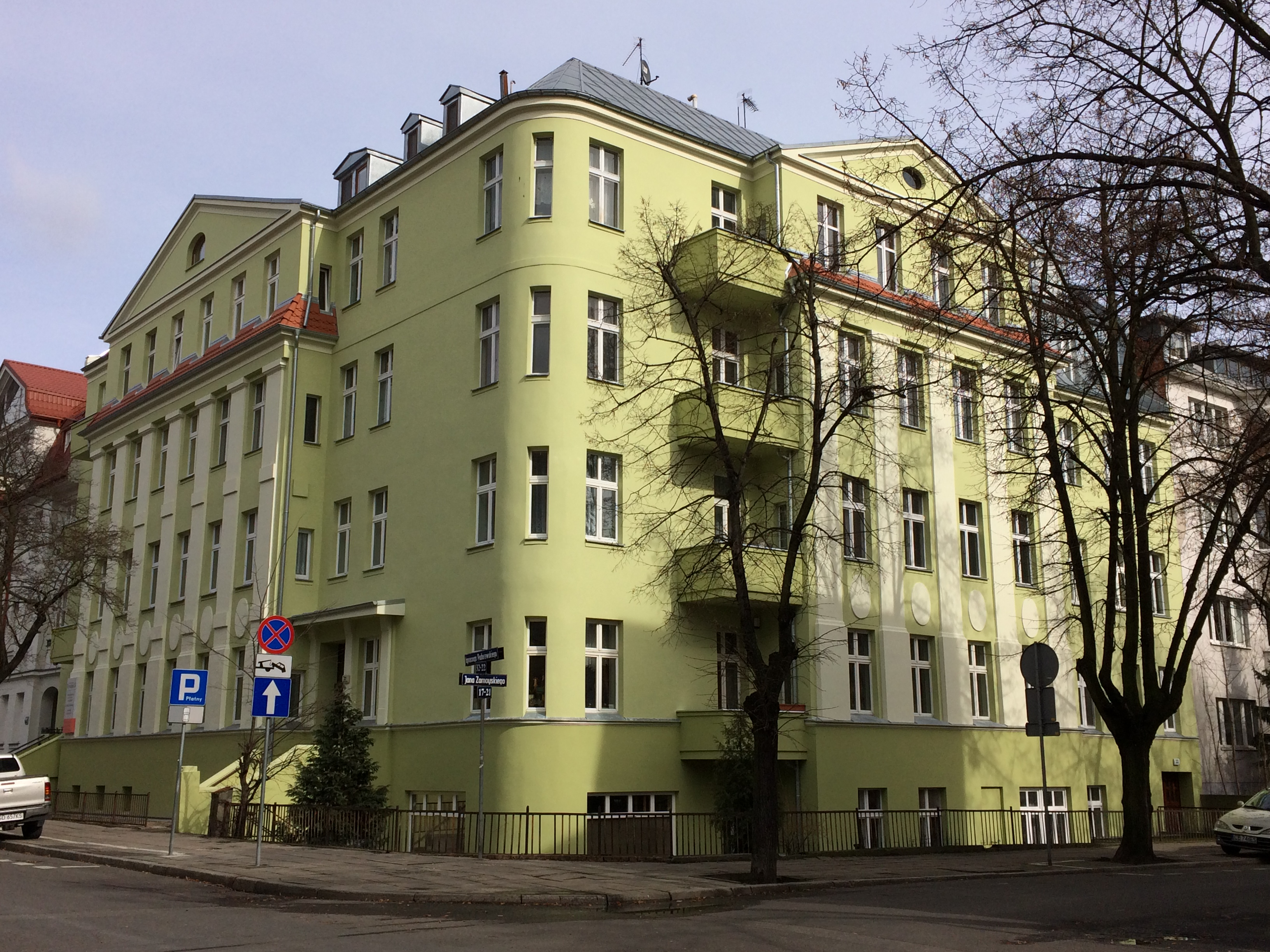
View from street intersection

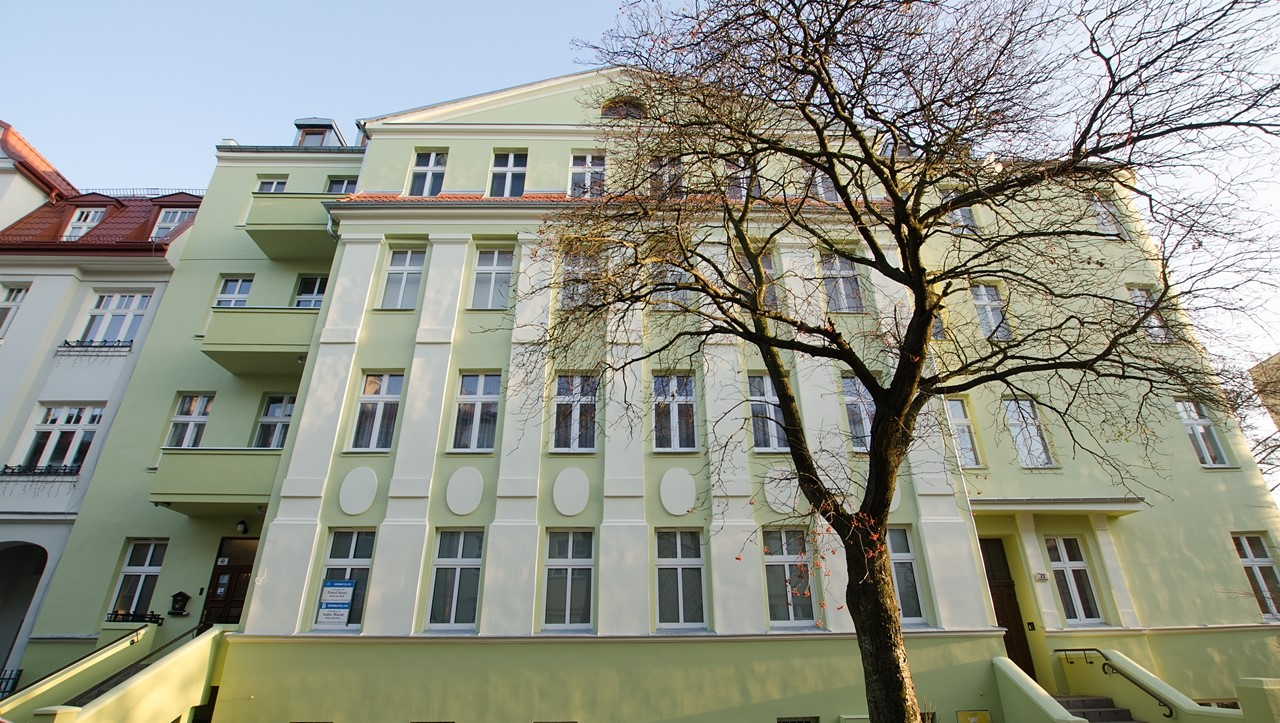
Frontage on Paderewskiego

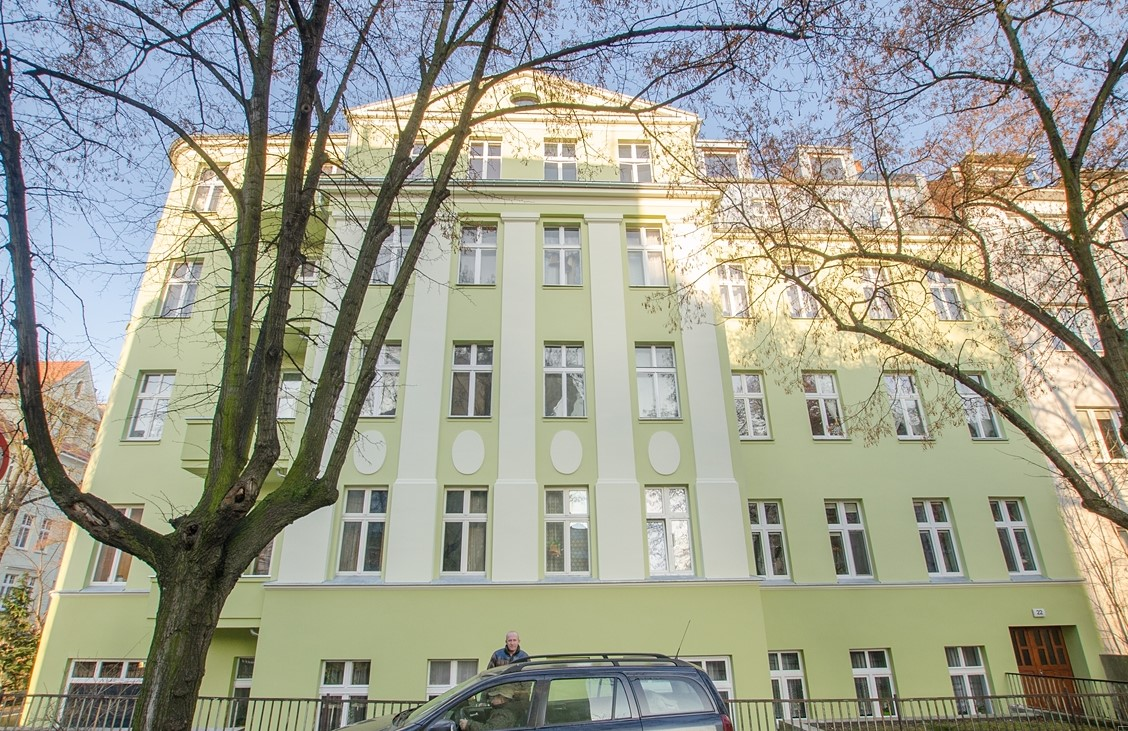
Frontage on Zamoyskiego

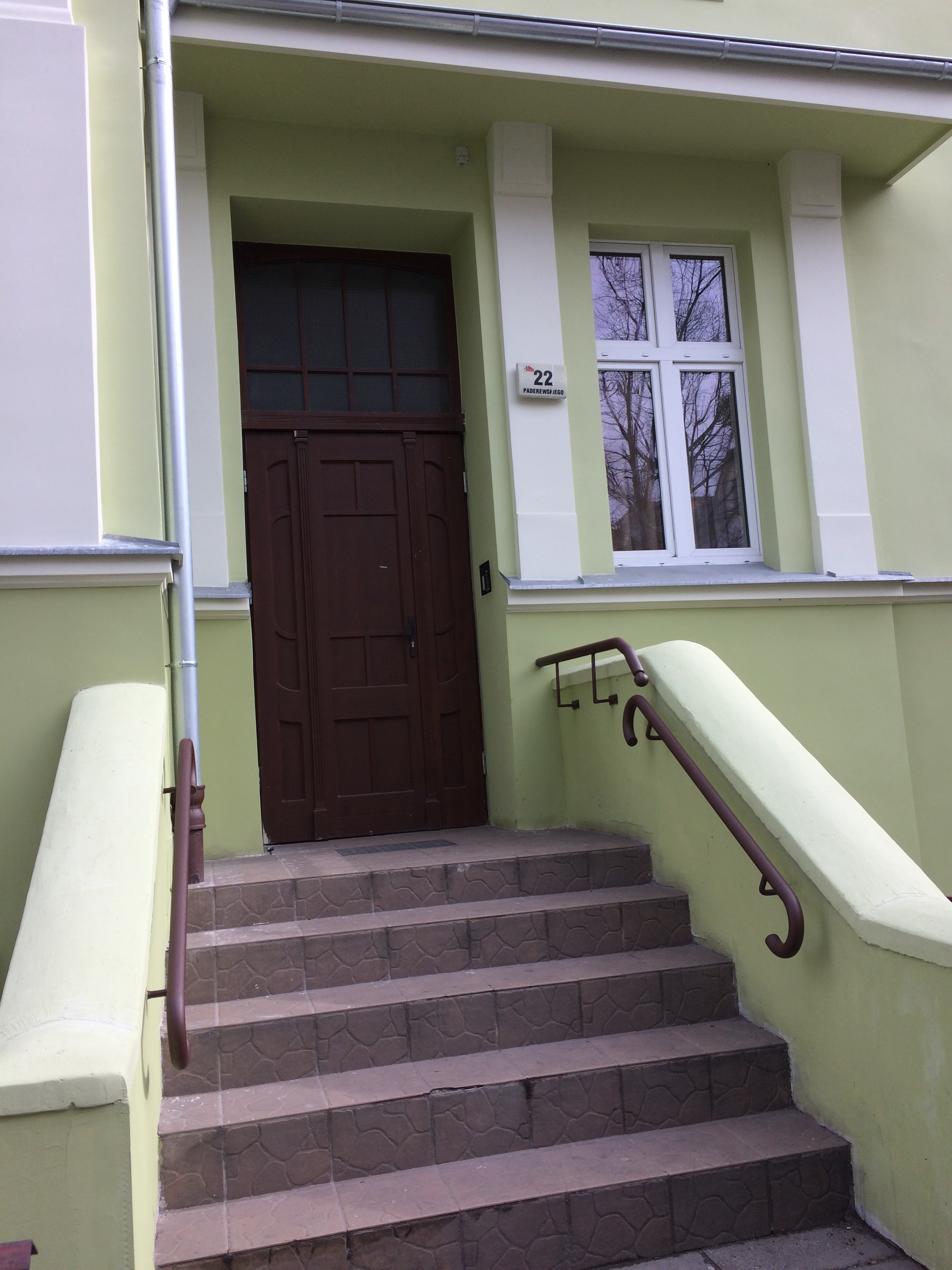
Right side entry gate

Tenement at 23, corner with Chodkiewicza street

1913–1915, by Rudolf Kern

Eclecticism & Art Nouveau

The commissioner of this tenement was an investor, Julius Berger, who also funded other buildings in the street. The first landlord was a merchant, Mr Lange, who never lived there.

Both facades combine eclectic-neo-classical style (symmetry in the openings, corner bay window), and Art Nouveau features (vegetal motifs, rosettes, festoons, curved shape decoration inside cartouches).

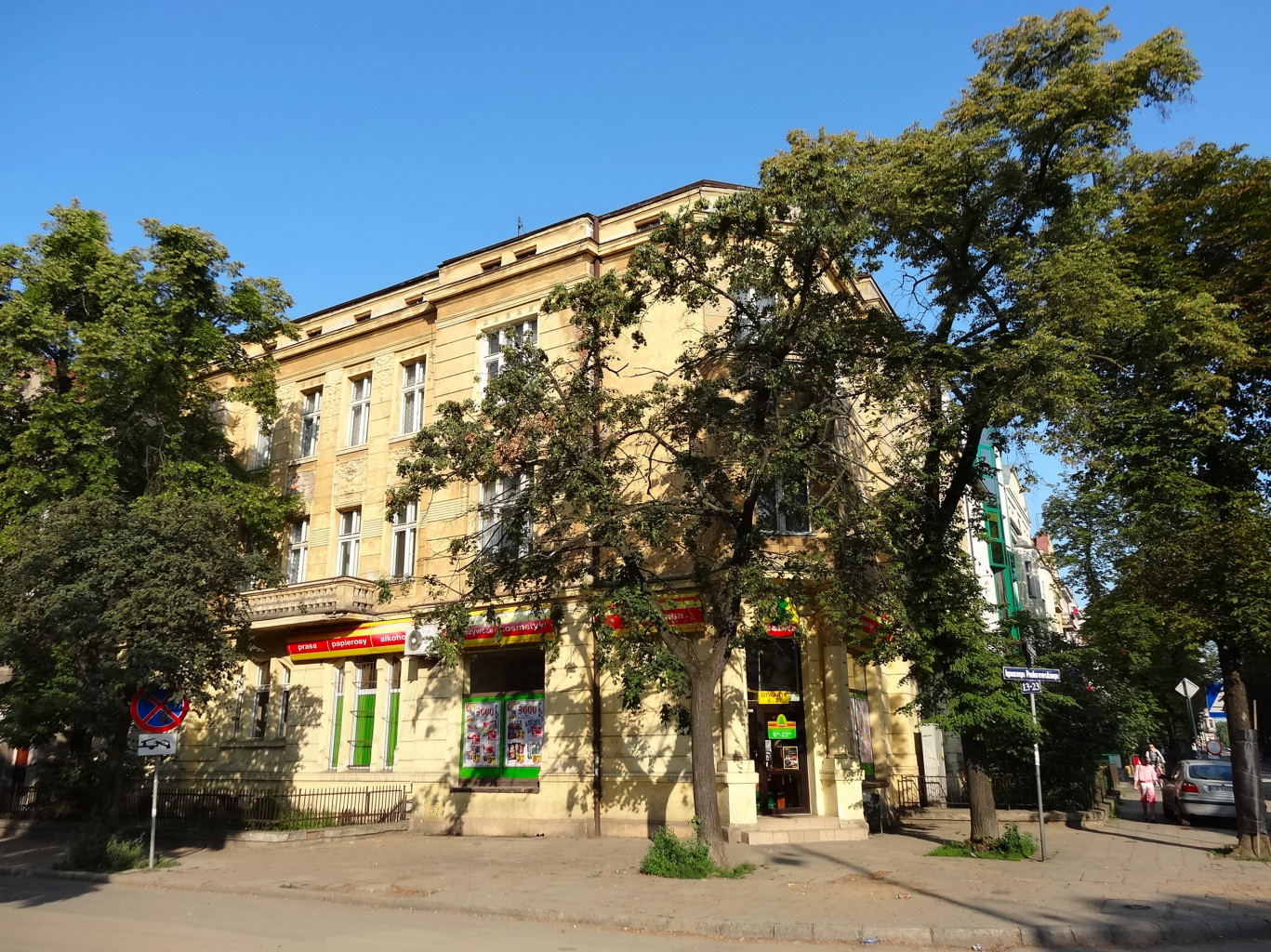
View of both frontages from the street

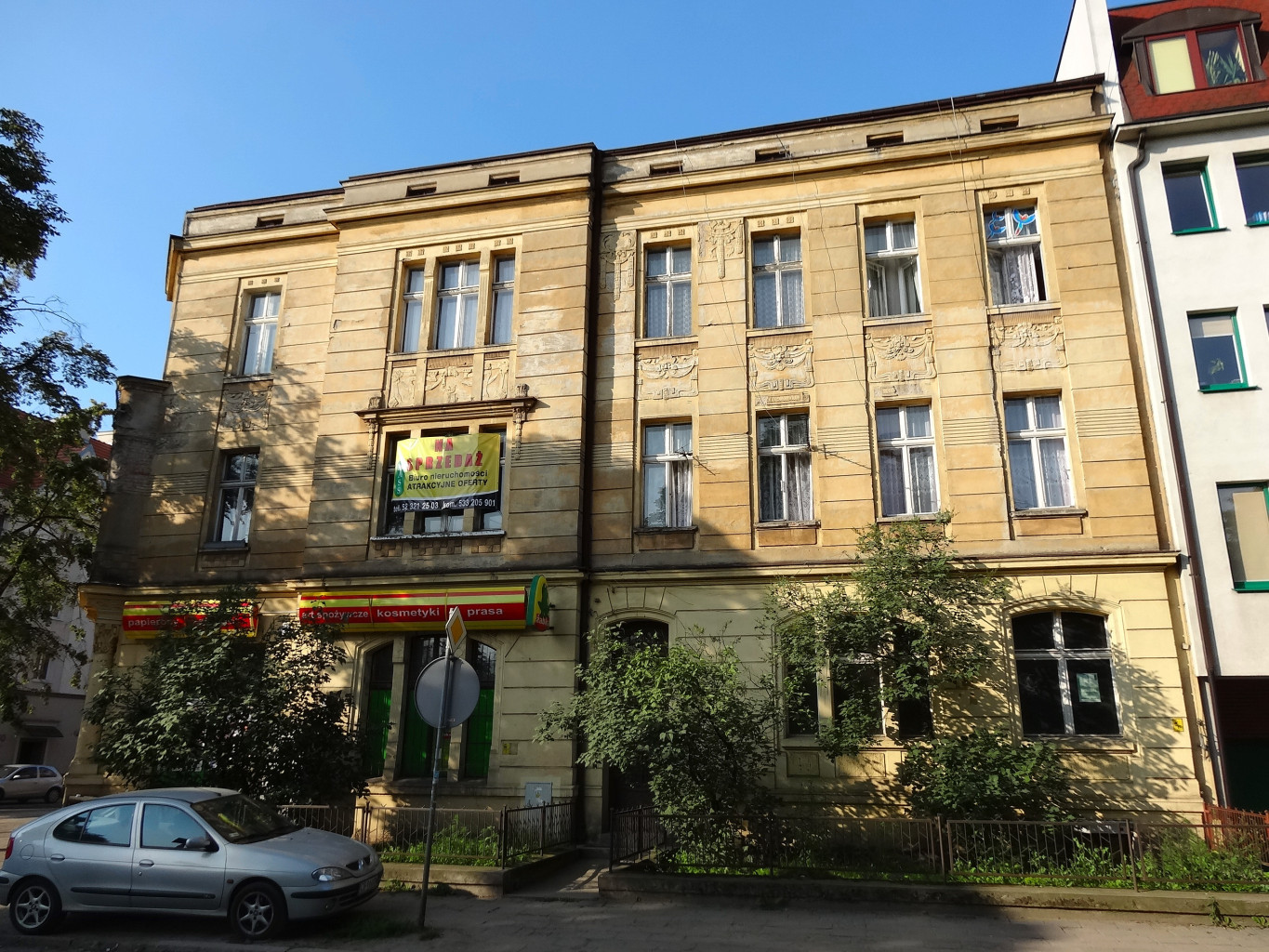
Elevation on Chodkiewicza street

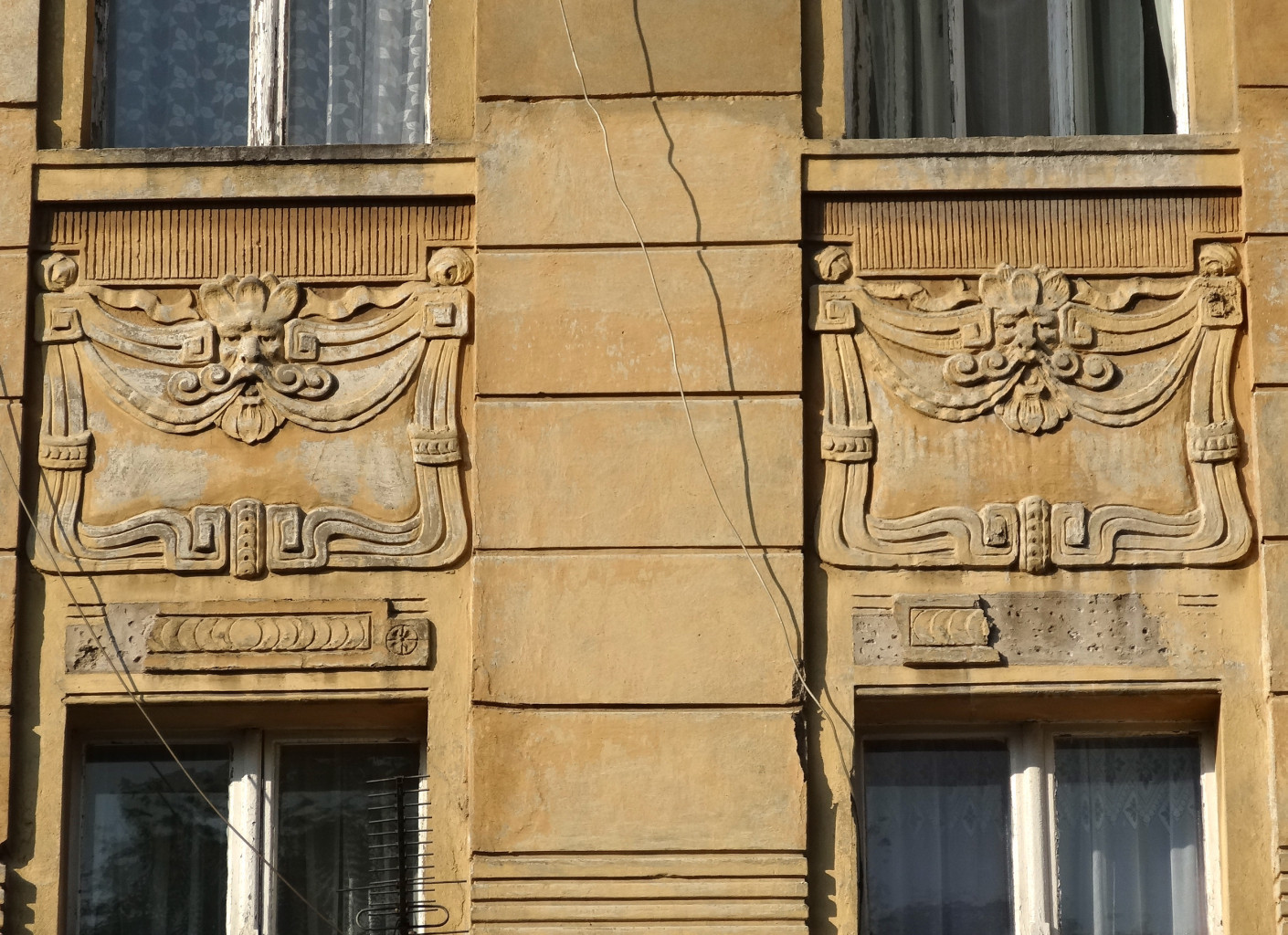
Mask motif in cartouches

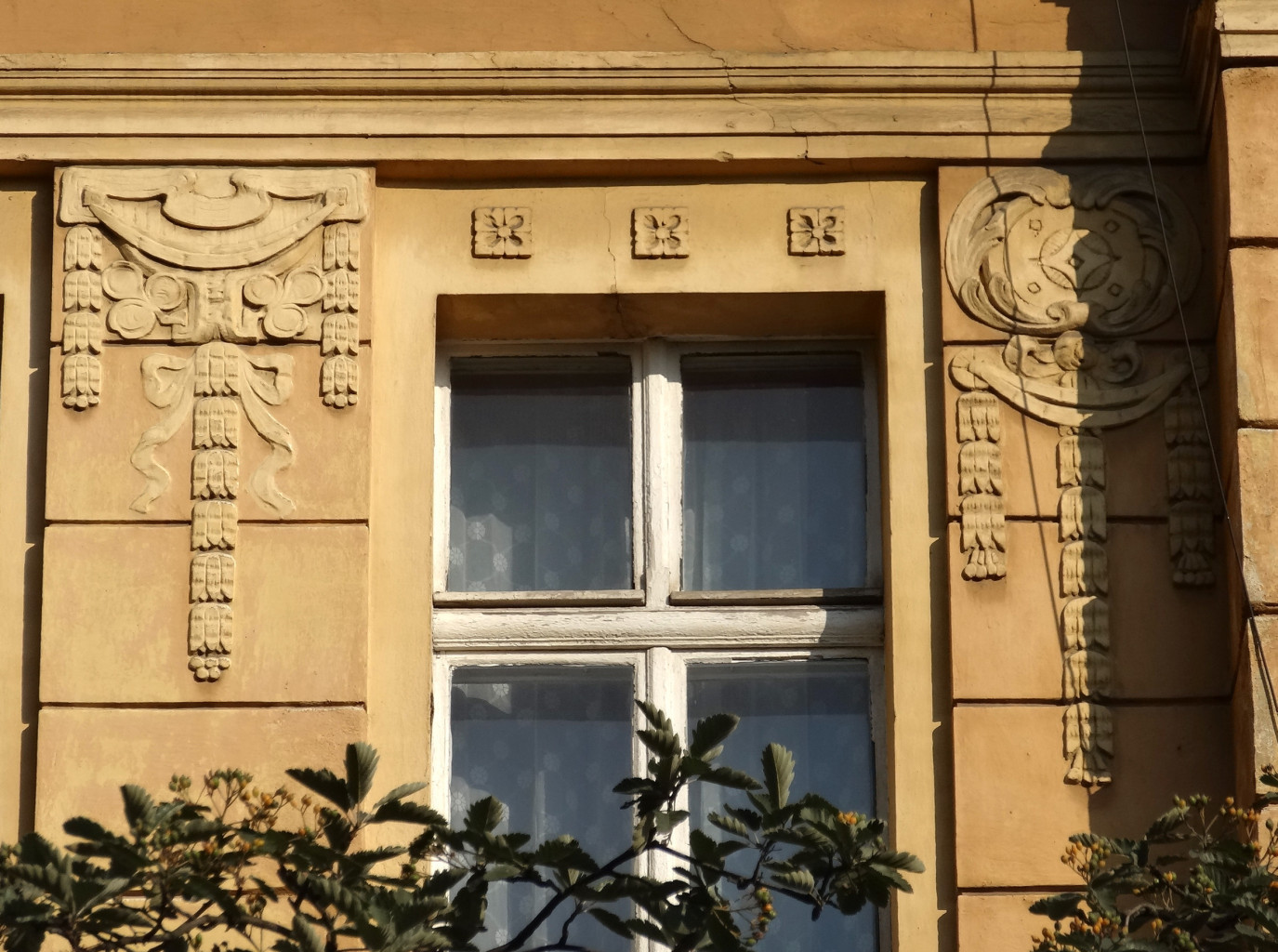
Vegetal festoons and motifs of the facade

Johann Petrikowski's house at 24

1913–1915, by Johann Petrikowski

Early Modernism

The building's initial address was Schillerstraße 6: the architect was its first landlord and also the project investor.

The renovation performed at the end of 2016 emphasizes the balance of the main frontage, underlined by a massive avant-corps enhanced by lean ornamental pillars and crowned by triangular wall dormer bearing a large glass opening.

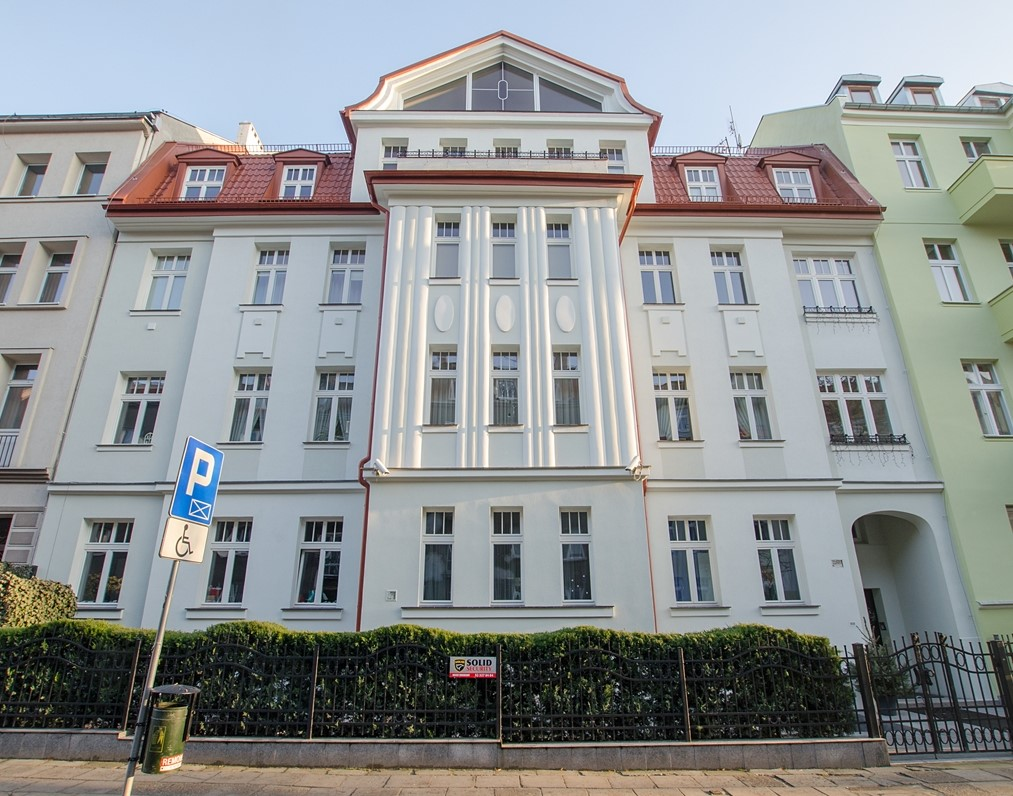
Main frontage on the street

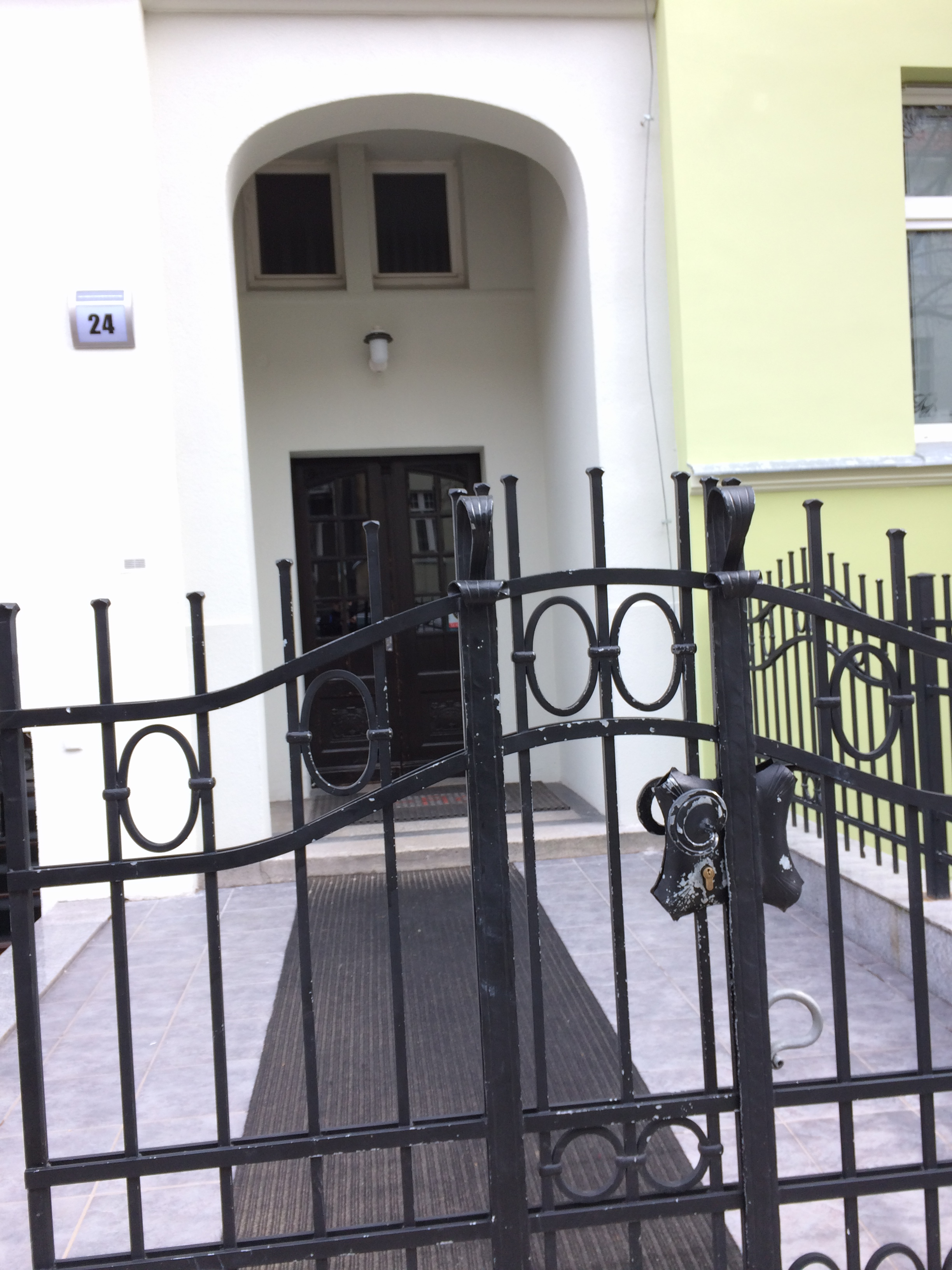
Entry portal and wrought iron fence

== See also ==
- Bydgoszcz
- Fritz Weidner
- Bydgoszcz Architects (1850-1970s)

== Bibliography ==
- (in Polish) Derkowska-Kostkowska, Bogna (1999). O zalozeniu Sielanki – bydgoskiego miasta ogrodu. Materially do dziejow kultury i sztuki bydgoszczy T4. Bydgoszcz: Pracownia Dokumentacji i Popularyzacji zabytków Wojewódzkiego osrodja kultury w Bydgoszczy
- Bręczewska-Kulesza, Daria (2004). Nowoczesna dzielnica mieszkaniowa z początku XX w. – Kronika Bydgoska T26 (in Polish). Bydgoszcz: Towarzystwo Miłosnikow Miasta Bydgoszczy – Bydgoskie Towarzystwo Naukowe. pp. 69 to 94.
- (in Polish) Gliwinski, Eugeniusz: Bydgoskie pomniki naszych czasów cz. 1 (1997) & 2 (1998). Kalendarz Bydgoski. Bydgoszcz: Towarzystwo Milosników Miasta Bydgoszczy.
