= Jana Zamoyskiego Street, Bydgoszcz =

Street in Bydgoszcz, Poland

Coordinates: 53°07′56″N 18°00′51″E

Jana Zamoyskiego Street
Bydgoszcz
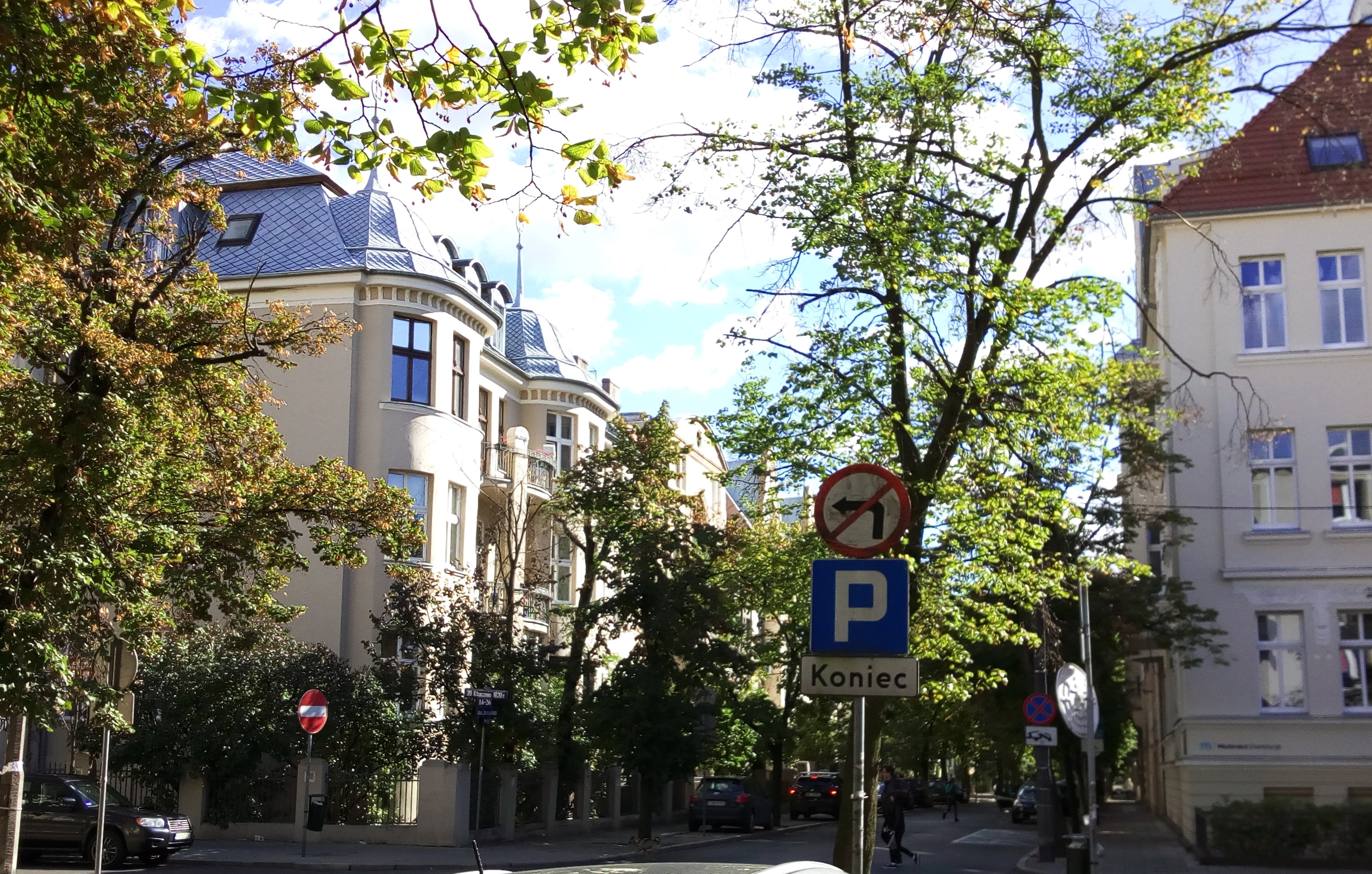
- Facades view at intersection with 20 Stycznia 1920 Street

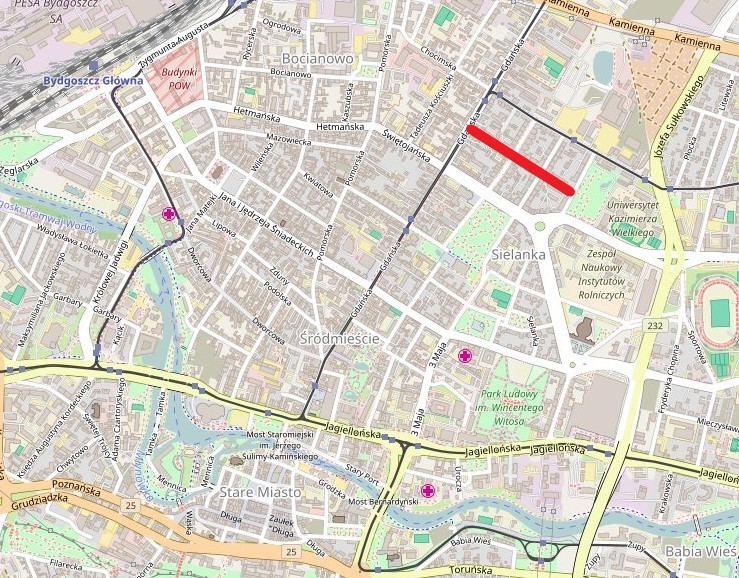
- Zamoyskiego Street on Bydgoszcz map
- Native name: Ulica Jana Zamoyskiego (Polish)
- Former name: Stein Straße
- Namesake: Jan Zamoyski
- Owner: City of Bydgoszcz
- Length: 450 m (1,480 ft) Google Maps
- Width: ca. 10m
- Area: Downtown district
- Location: Bydgoszcz, Poland

Construction
- Construction start: 1908
- Completed: Early 1940s

Jana Zamoyskiego Street is located in downtown district, in Bydgoszcz, Poland. Most of its buildings display Eclectic, Art Nouveau or early modernist architectural styles. One of them is registered on the Kuyavian-Pomeranian Voivodeship heritage list.

== Location ==
The street is located to the north of downtown district (Polish: Śródmieście), and follows a west–east axis, parallel to the north to Adam Mickiewicz Alley. To the west, it starts at Gdańska Street and its western tip ends when meeting with Niemcewicza street: in its course, it crosses 20 Stycznia 1920 and Paderewskiego streets.

== History ==
The path has been developed lately at the beginning of the 20th century, under Prussian rule. First reference to the then Stein Straße is mentioned in the 1908 Bromberg Address Book, as being vacant or under development. First houses appeared in 1909, and by the outbreak of WWI, a dramatic increase of construction of the plots can be noticed.

=== Naming ===
Through the course of Bydgoszcz history, the street swapped its calling between the Prussian initial name Stein straße (from 1908 to 1918 and during the German occupation) and the Polish one (from 1918 to 1939, and since 1945). Stein straße stemmed from Baron vom Stein (1757–1831), a Prussian statesman.

Current name Zamoyskiego street refers to Jan Zamoyski (1542–1605), a Polish nobleman, Lord Grand-Chancellor and Grand Hetman of the Crown from 1581. He was an advisor to Kings Sigismund II Augustus and Stephen Báthory, one of the most skilled diplomat of his time, standing as a major figure in the politics of the Polish–Lithuanian Commonwealth throughout his life.

== Main edifices ==
Tenement house at the corner with Gdańska Street

1887, by Józef Święcicki and Anton Hoffmann

Eclecticism & French Neo-Renaissance

Puttos and sirens stucco reliefs are mounted on the facade.

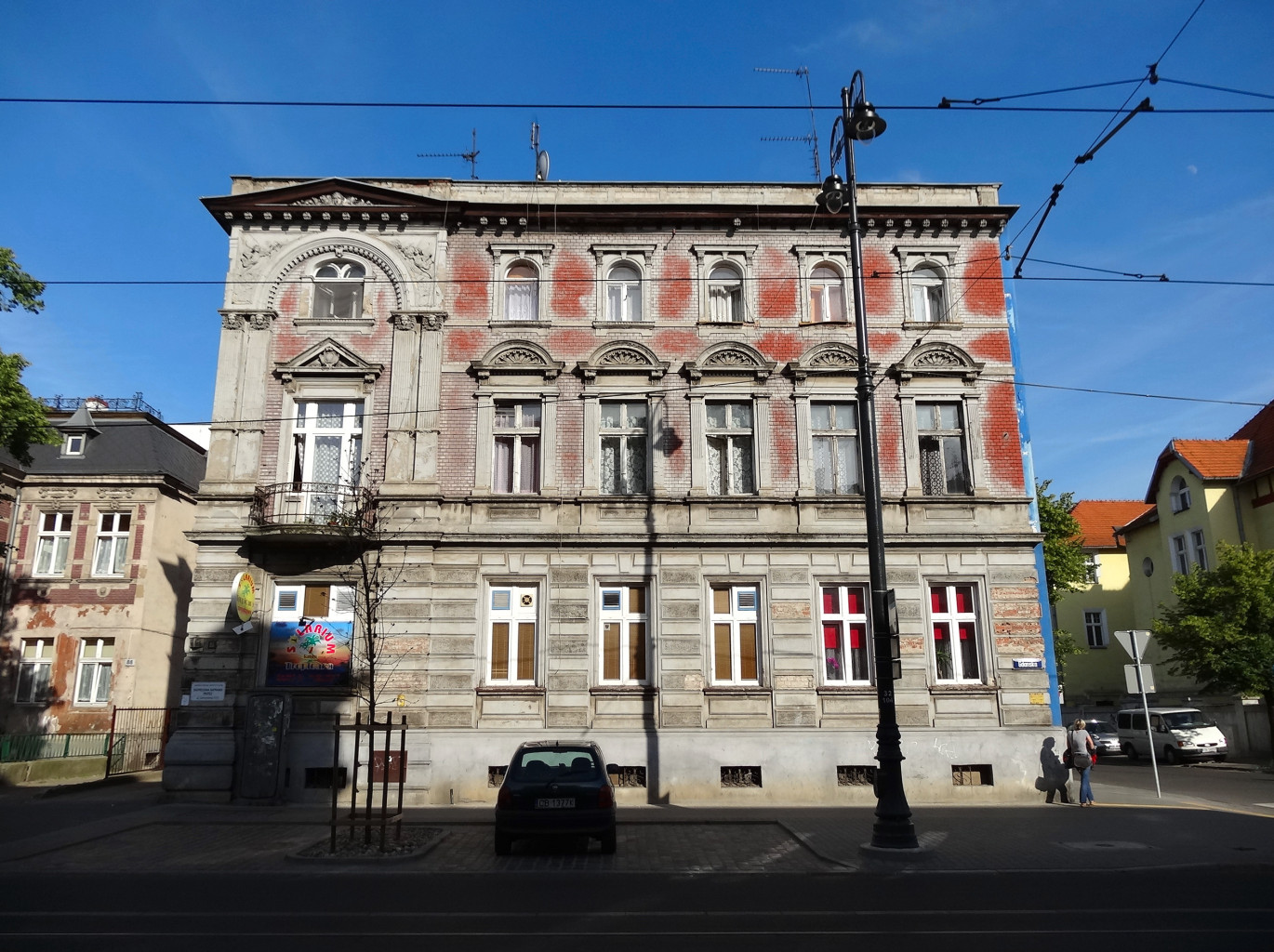
Main facade

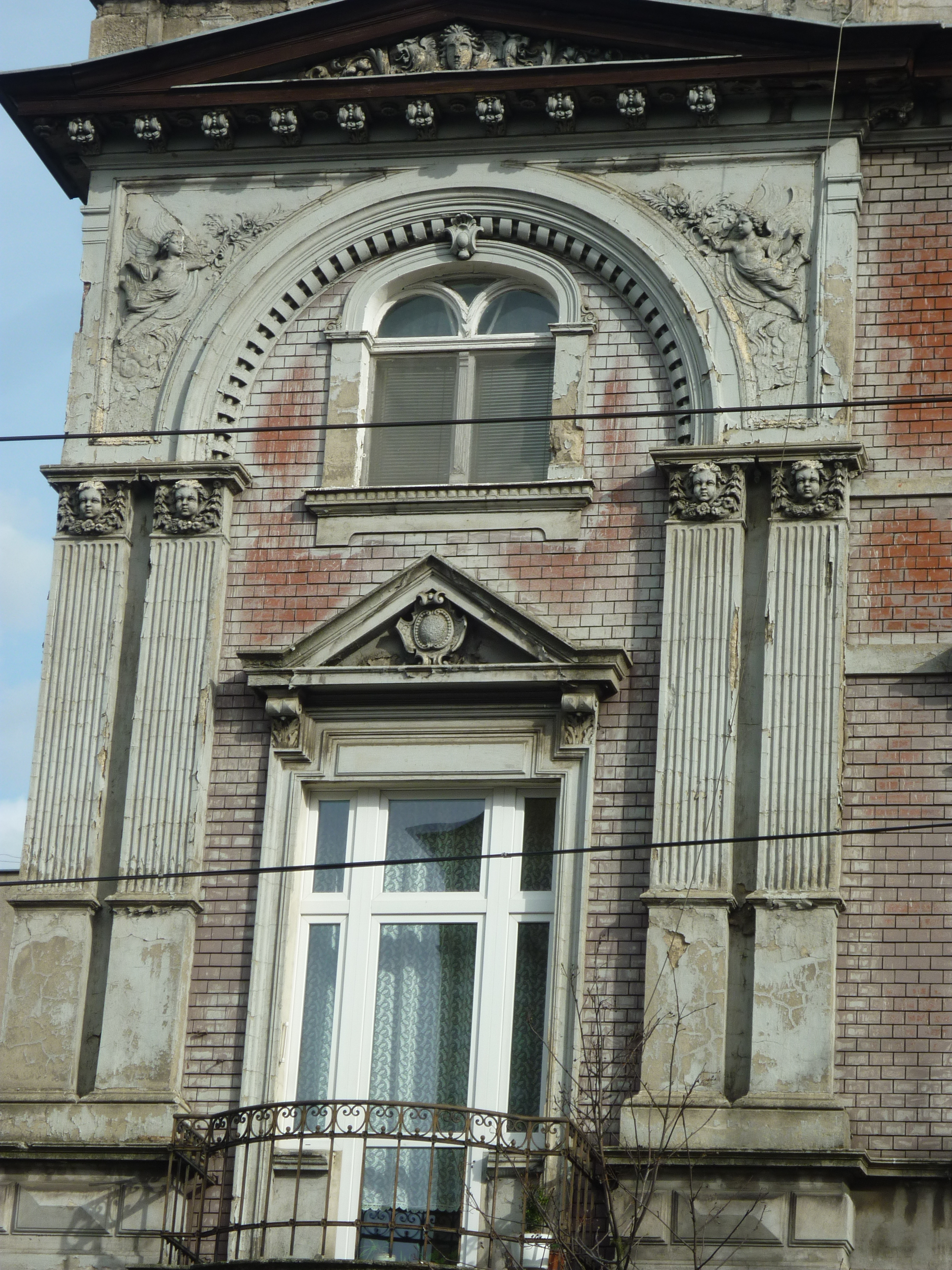
Architectural detail

Villa Carl Grosse, corner with Gdańska Street

Registered on Kuyavian-Pomeranian Voivodeship heritage list, Nr.601311-Reg.A/1056, 26 February 1997

1898–1899, by Karl Bergner

German Historicism

In the 1920s, rumor had it -mistakenly- that the villa belonged to Polish actress Apolonia Chalupiec, aka Pola Negri.

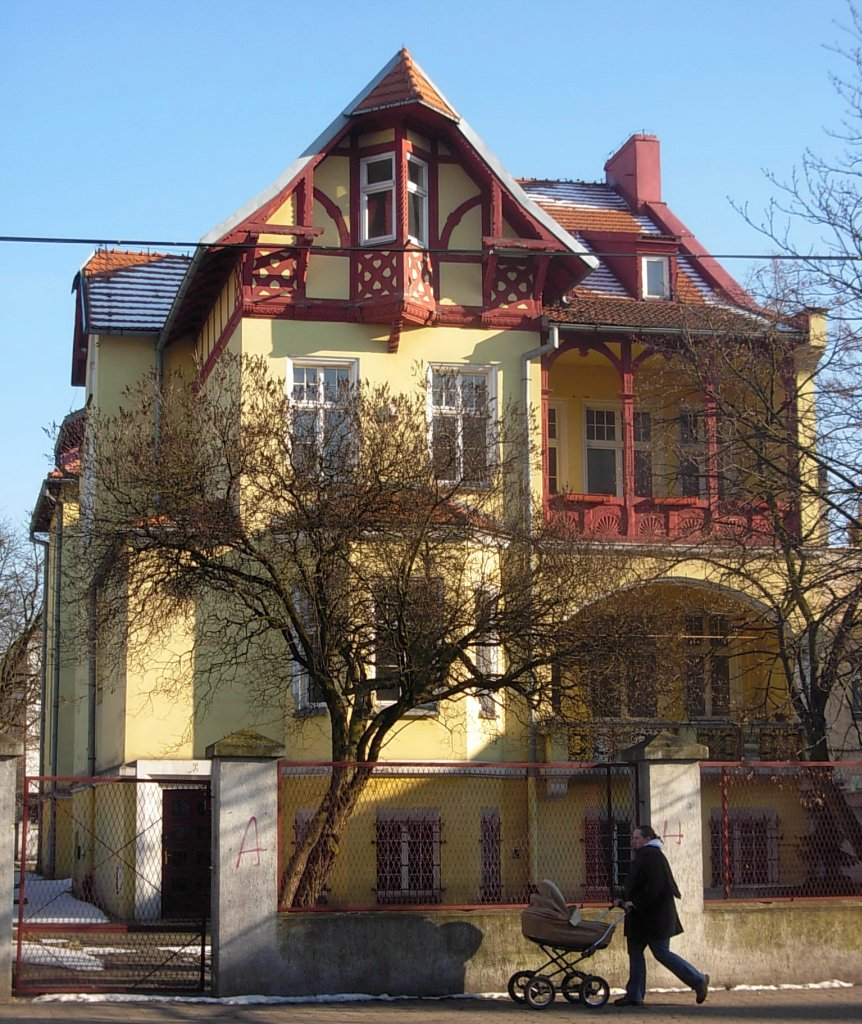
Villa Carl Grosse from Gdańska Street

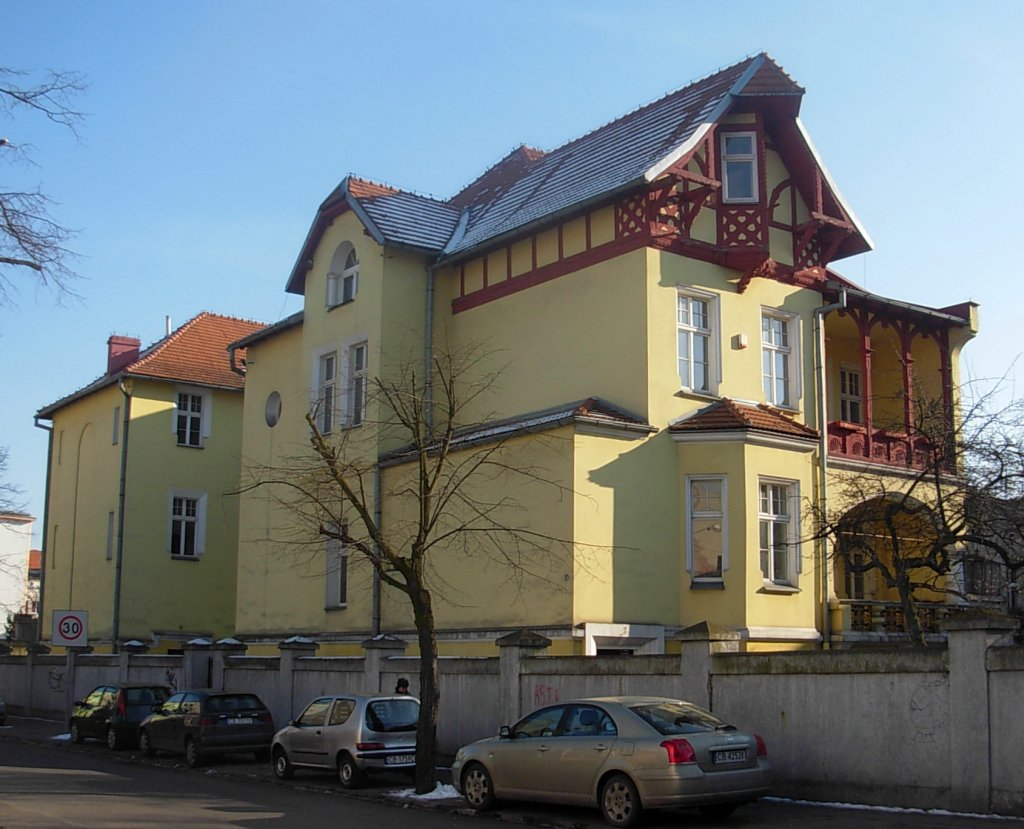
View from Zamoyski street

Tenement houses at 2 & 2a

1950s

Modern architecture

Modern buildings refurbished at the beginning of the 21st century. The building at Nr.2 houses the local edition of Gazeta Pomorska newspaper.

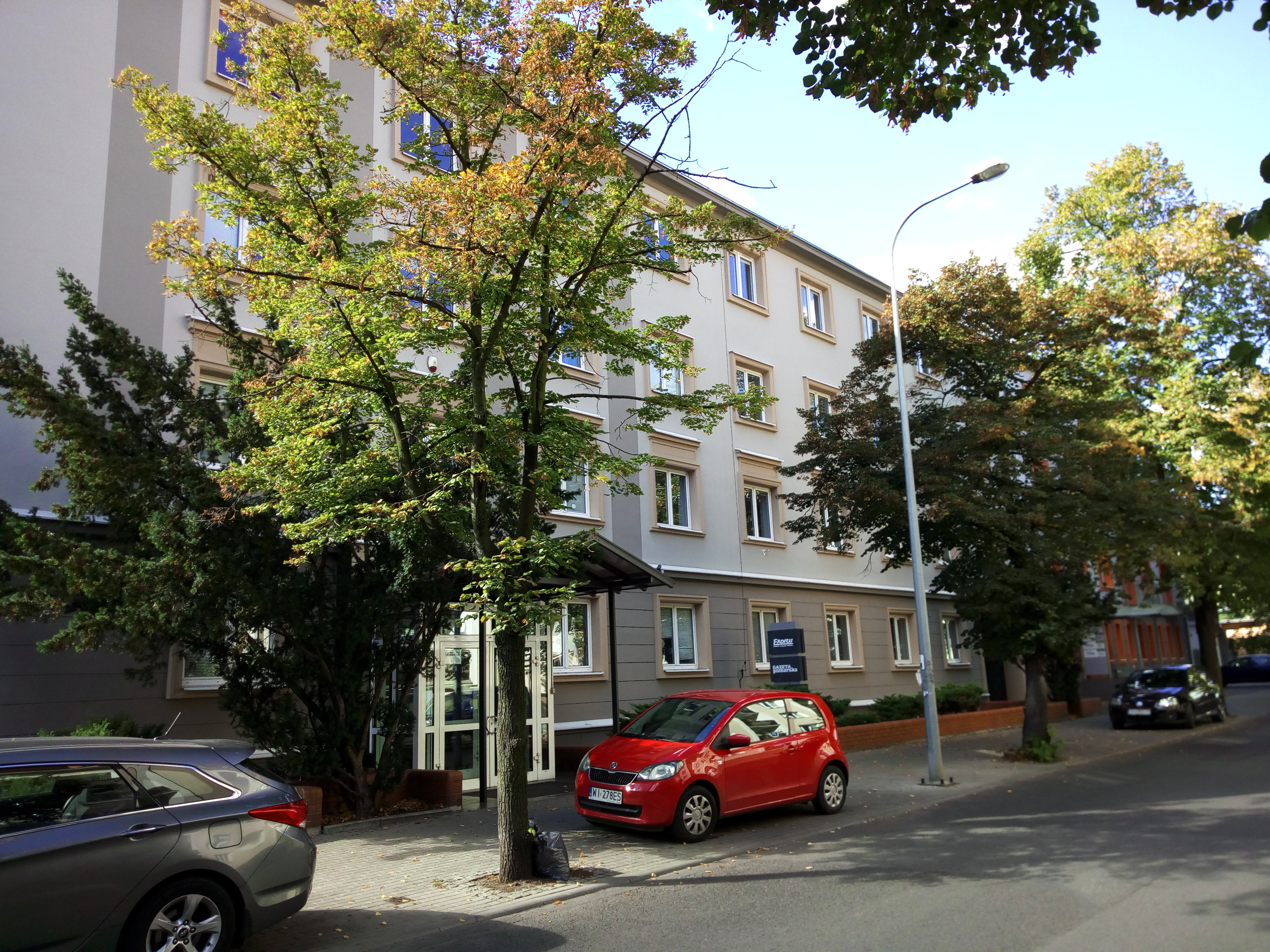
View of Nr.2 from the street

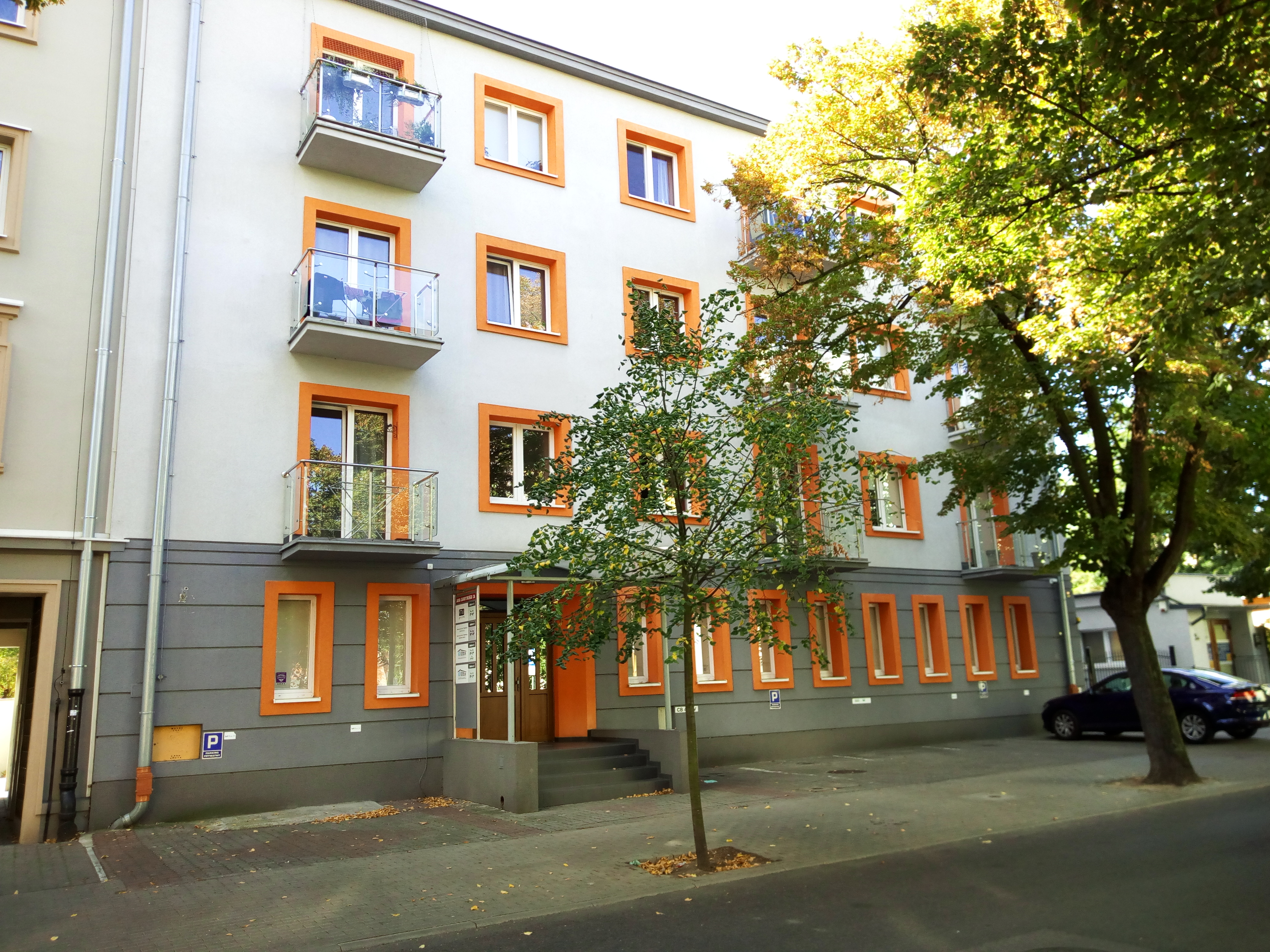
Facade at Nr.2a

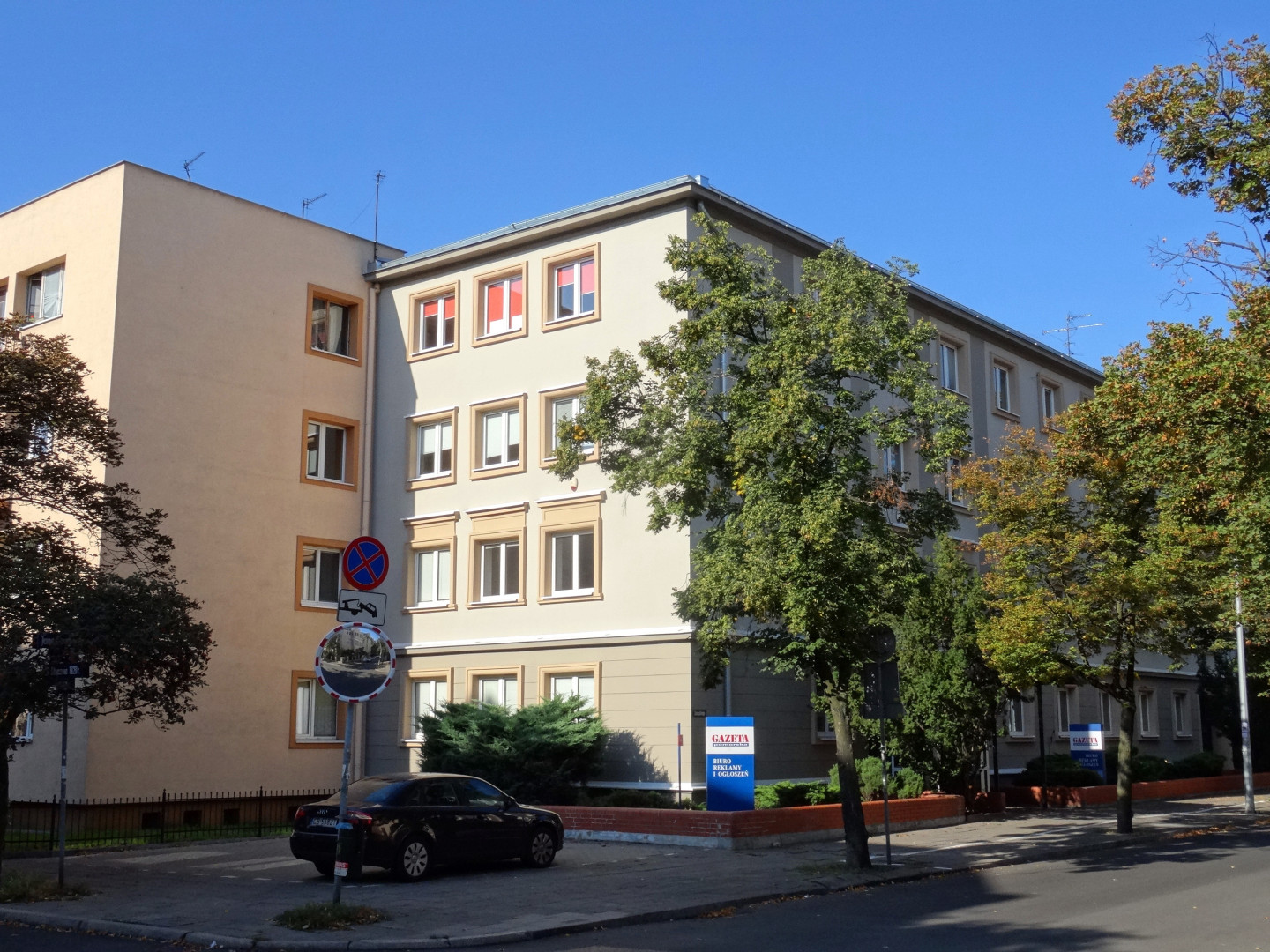
View of the Gazeta Pomorska building

Building at 2b

2010s

Modern architecture

This modern glass and metal setback building erected in 2017 is the seat of Bydgoszcz IT firm Softblue SA.

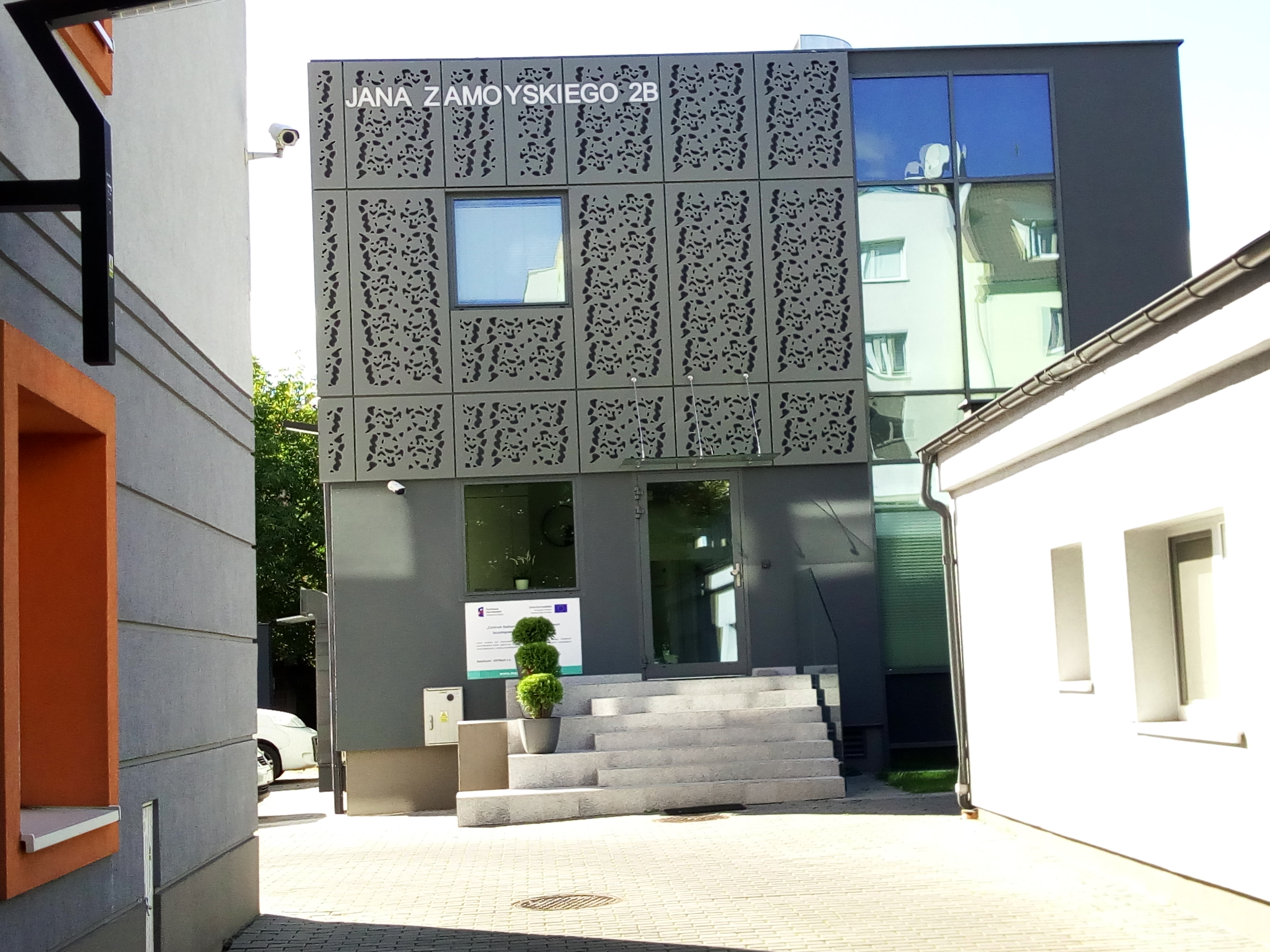
View from the street

Tenement houses at 3 & 3a

1930s

Modern architecture

These buildings from the late 1930s recall tenements in the neighbourhood, like those built by architect Jan Kossowski. The right facade at Nr.3a received a recent refurbishing.

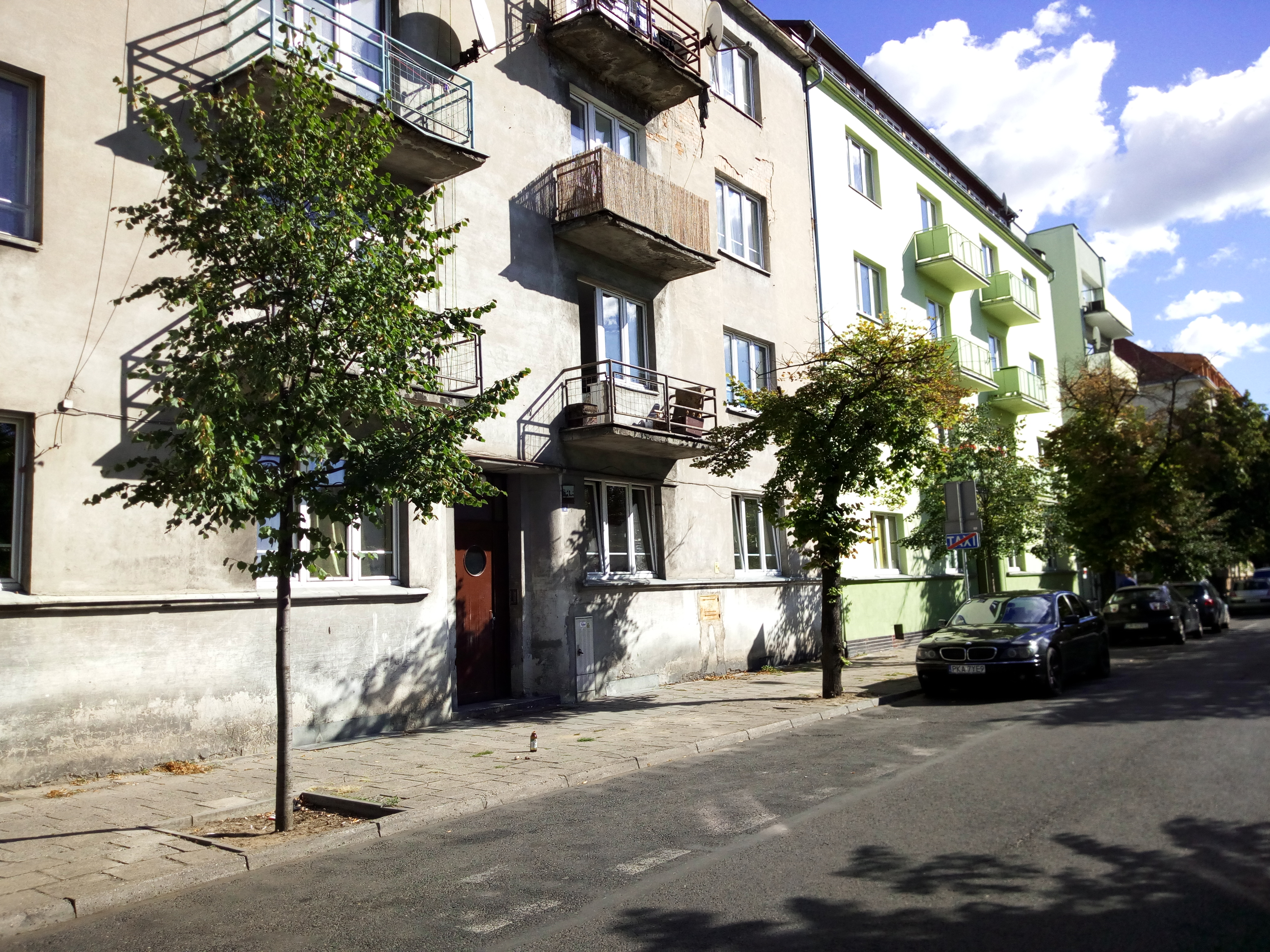
Frontage at Zamoyskiego 3

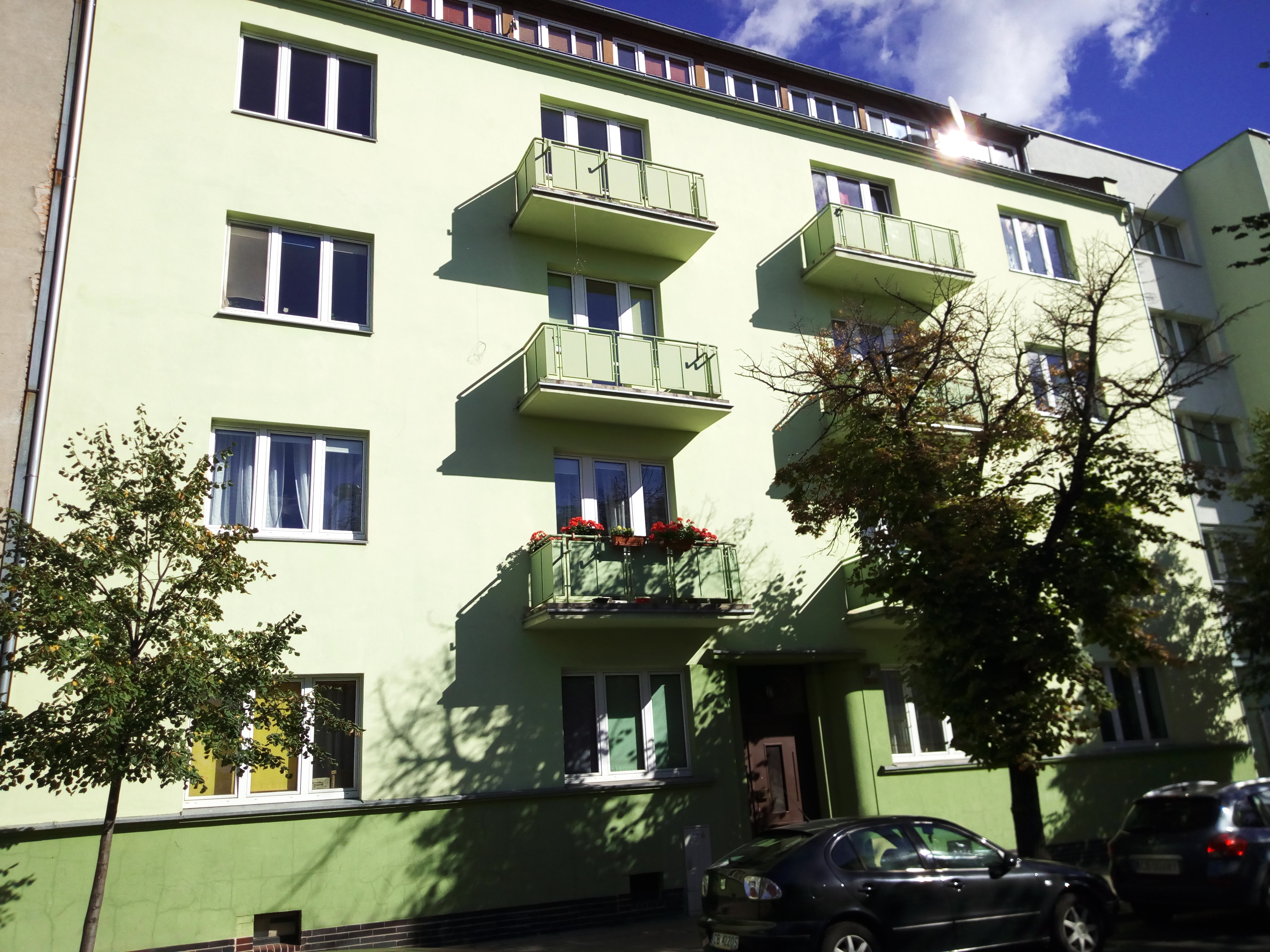
Renovated facade at 3a

Petrikowski Tenement at 4, corner with 14 20 Stycznia 1920 Street

1906–1907, by Victor Petrikowski

Art Nouveau

This large tenement from 1906 had as first landlord Victor Petrikowski, a carpenter and a construction entrepreneur who designed the building, then at Stein straße 23. In this house lived Edward Woyniłłowicz, a Polish and Belarusian social and economic activist, who left his eastern lands to dwell in Bydgoszcz. He wrote there his memoirs, Wspomnienia 1847-1928.

The edifice has been thoroughly renovated in 2015, preserving its historic Art Nouveau architectural details, alongside its specific decorated interiors (staircase, ornaments and stained glass), adorned with floral motifs and stylized faces.

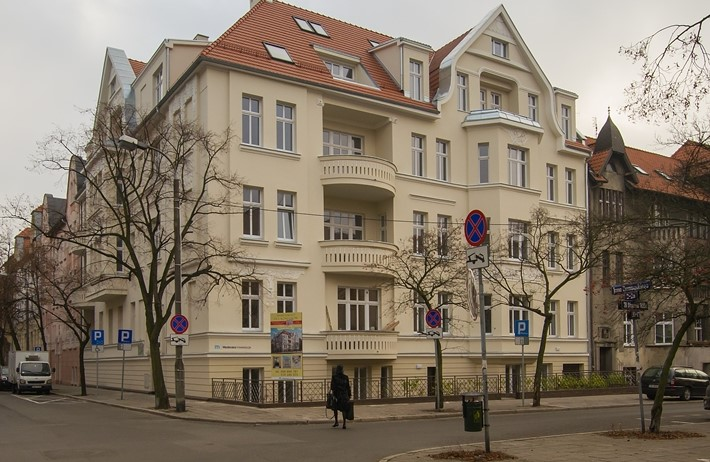
Corner view

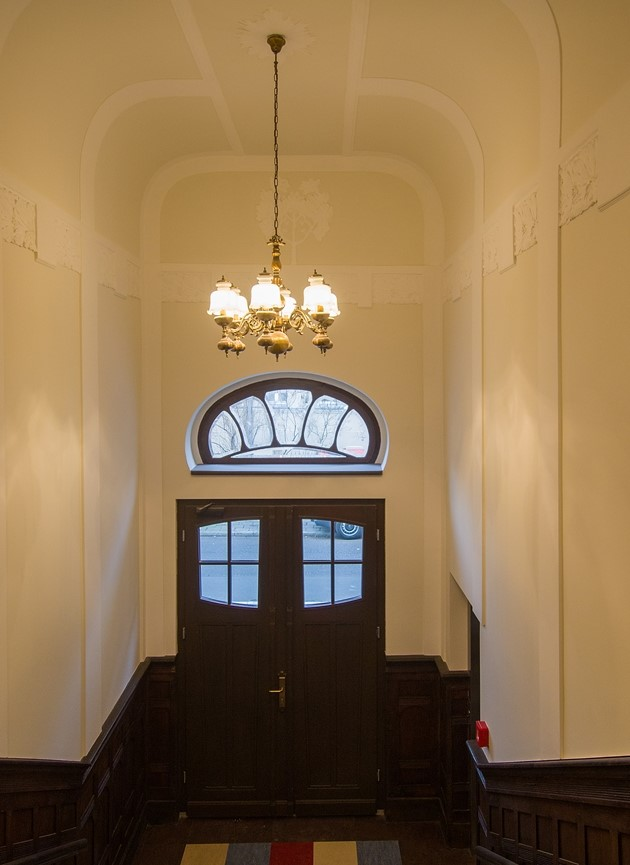
Main staircase

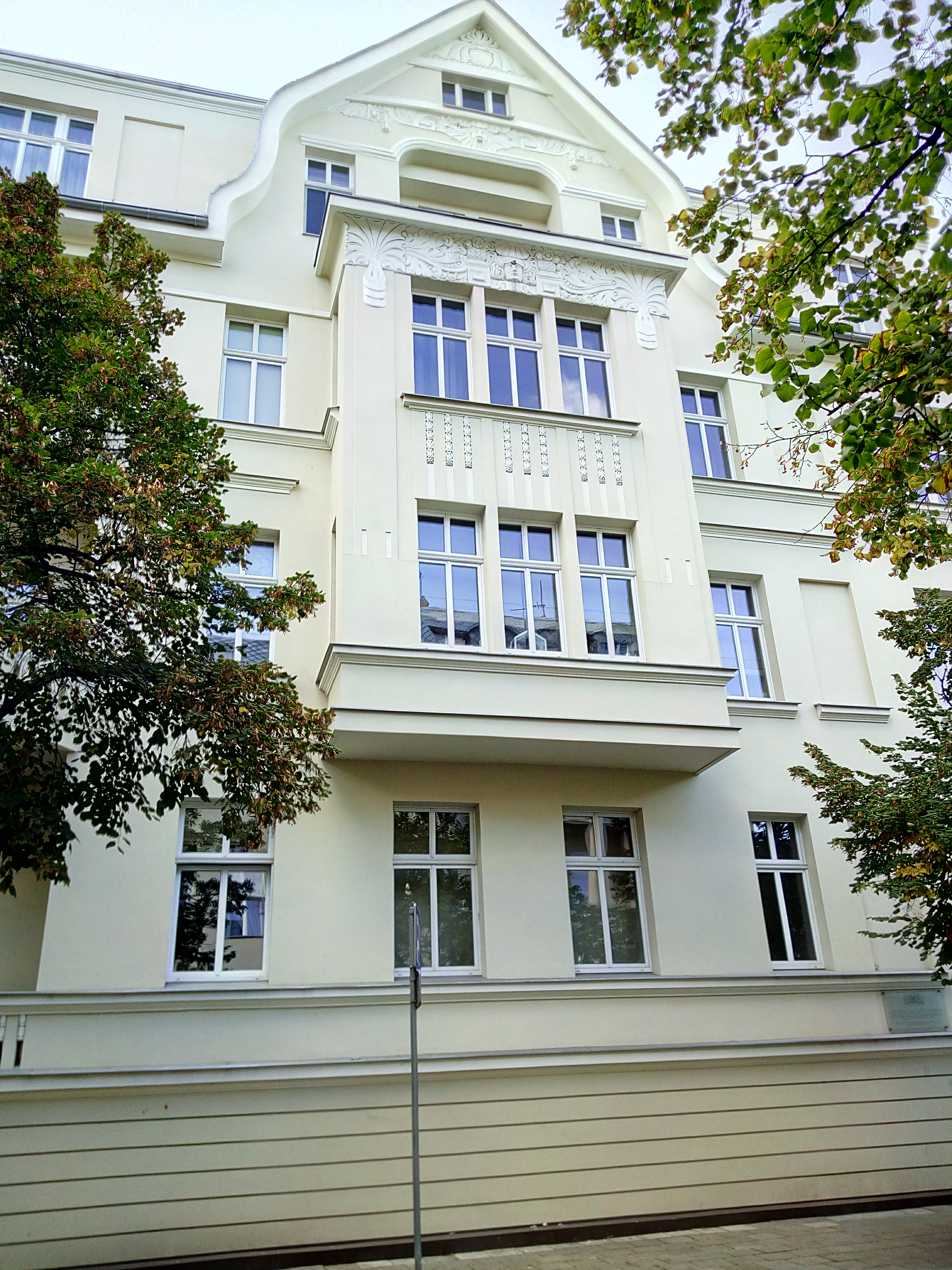
View of the adorned bay window

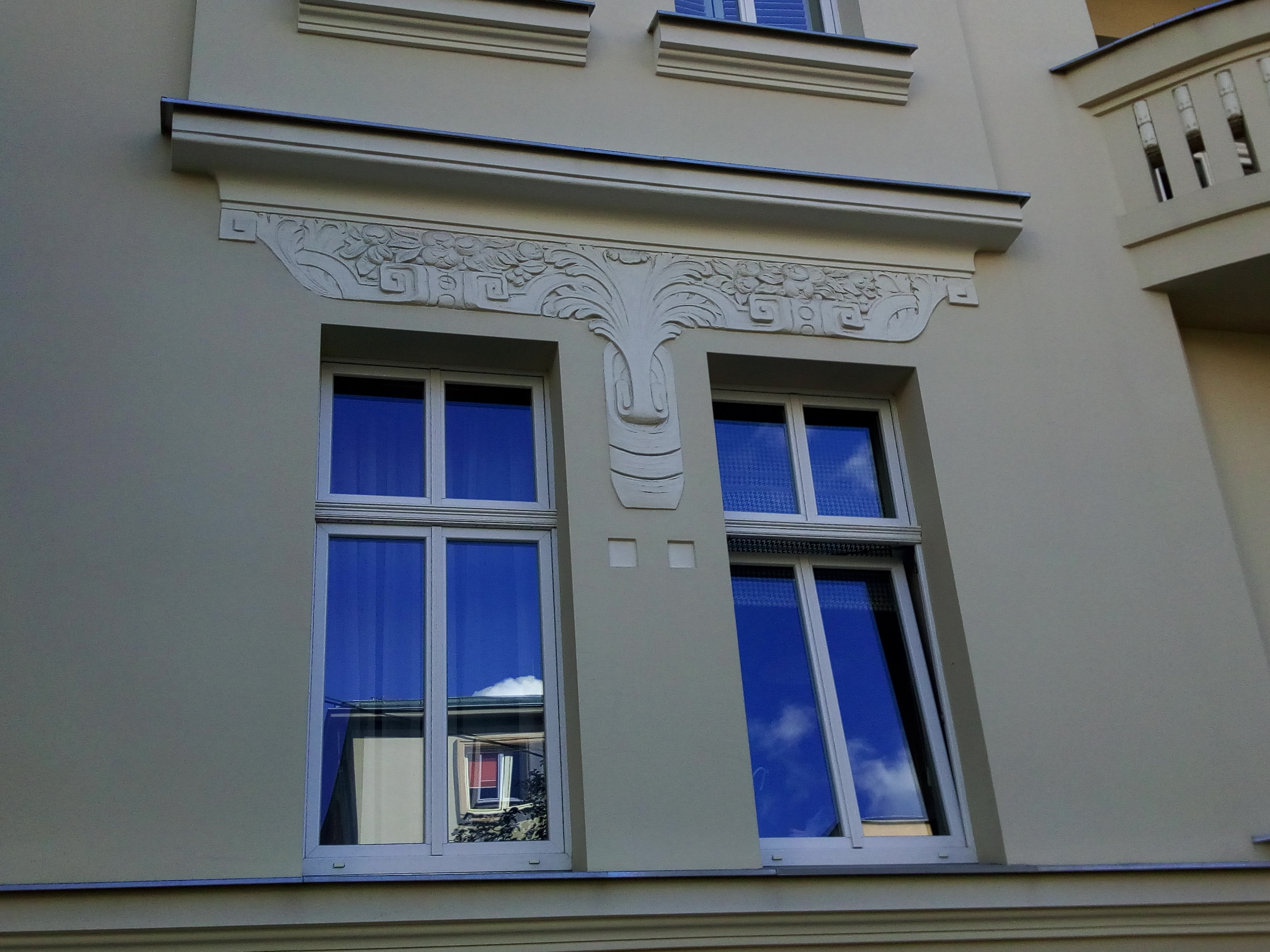
Detail of motifs

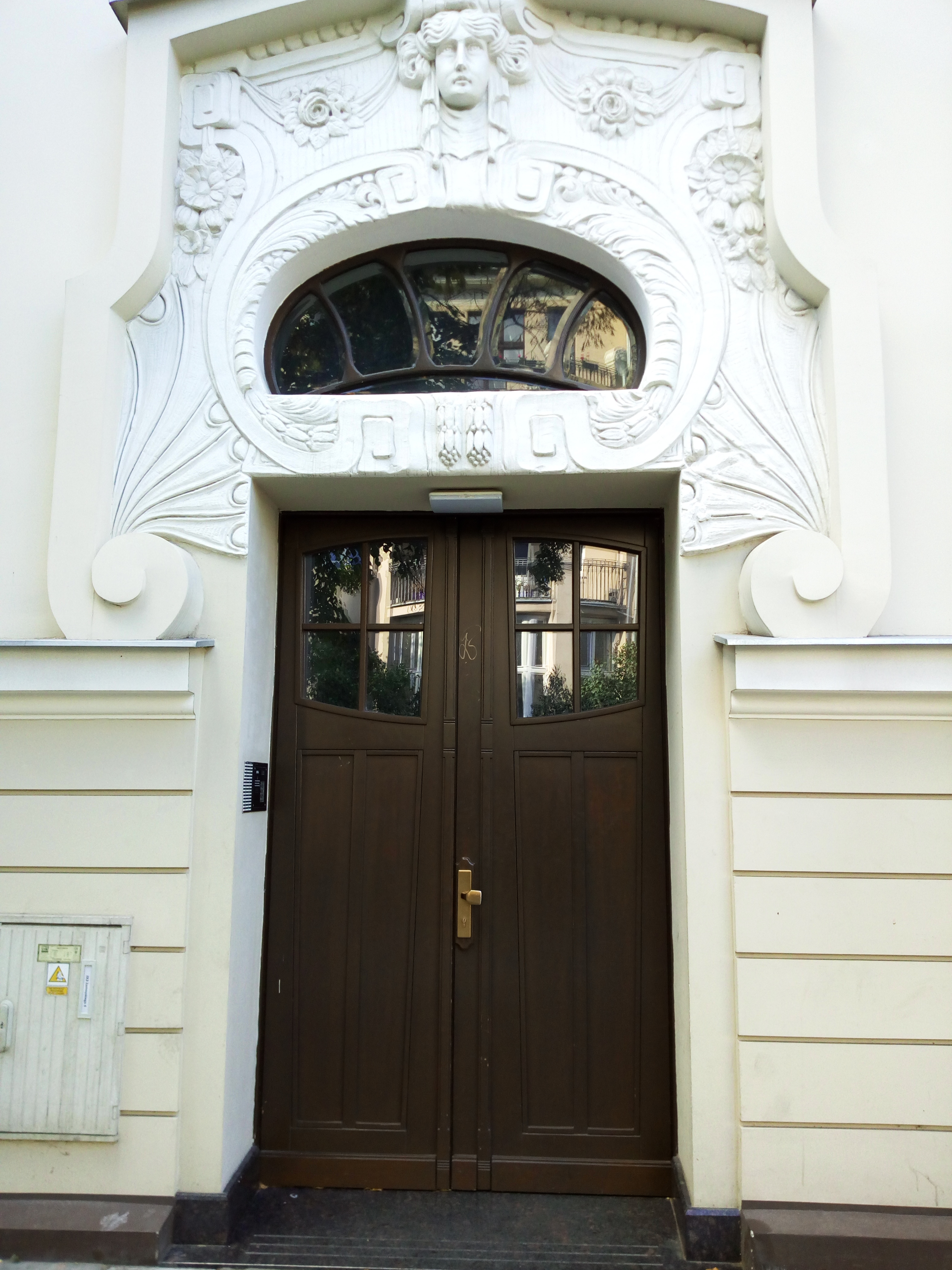
Decorated portal

Tenement at 6

1909, by Viktor Petrikowski

Art Nouveau

This grand tenement has been used for renting purposes since its inception: in 1915, one could list a dozen of tenant families inhabiting the building. In addition to the elaborate decoration of the entry portal with pilasters, masks and floral Art Nouveau patterns, the initials MR, of the first landlord, Max Reschke, a wood factory entrepreneur can still be seen. The Regamey family was accommodated their in the early 1920s when arriving from the Eastern Borderlands.

The successful renovation of the tenement in 2015 allows to appreciate the quality of the Art Nouveau stuccoes, be it in the adornment of the widow tops or in the motifs embellishing the gables.

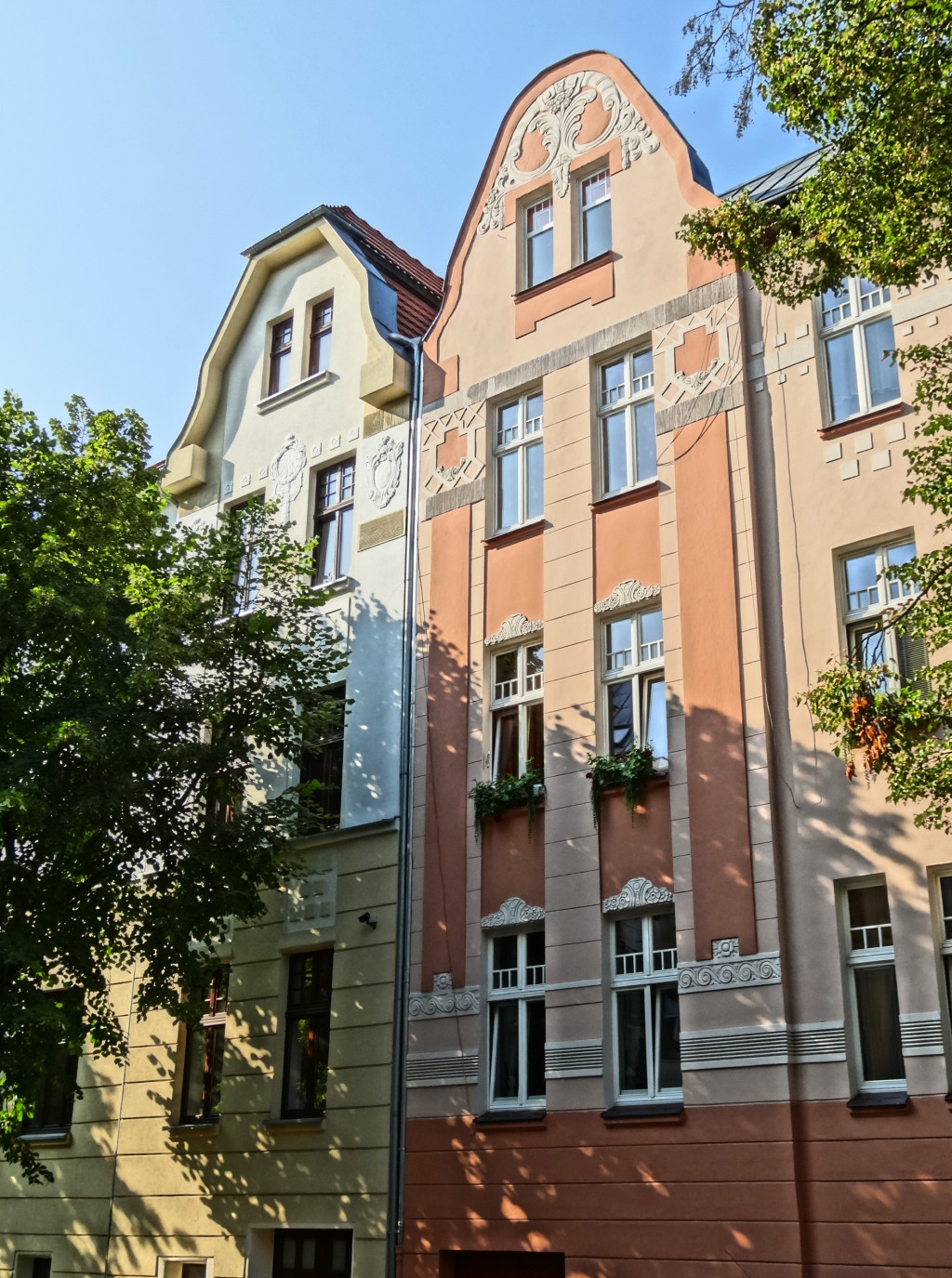
Renovated facade

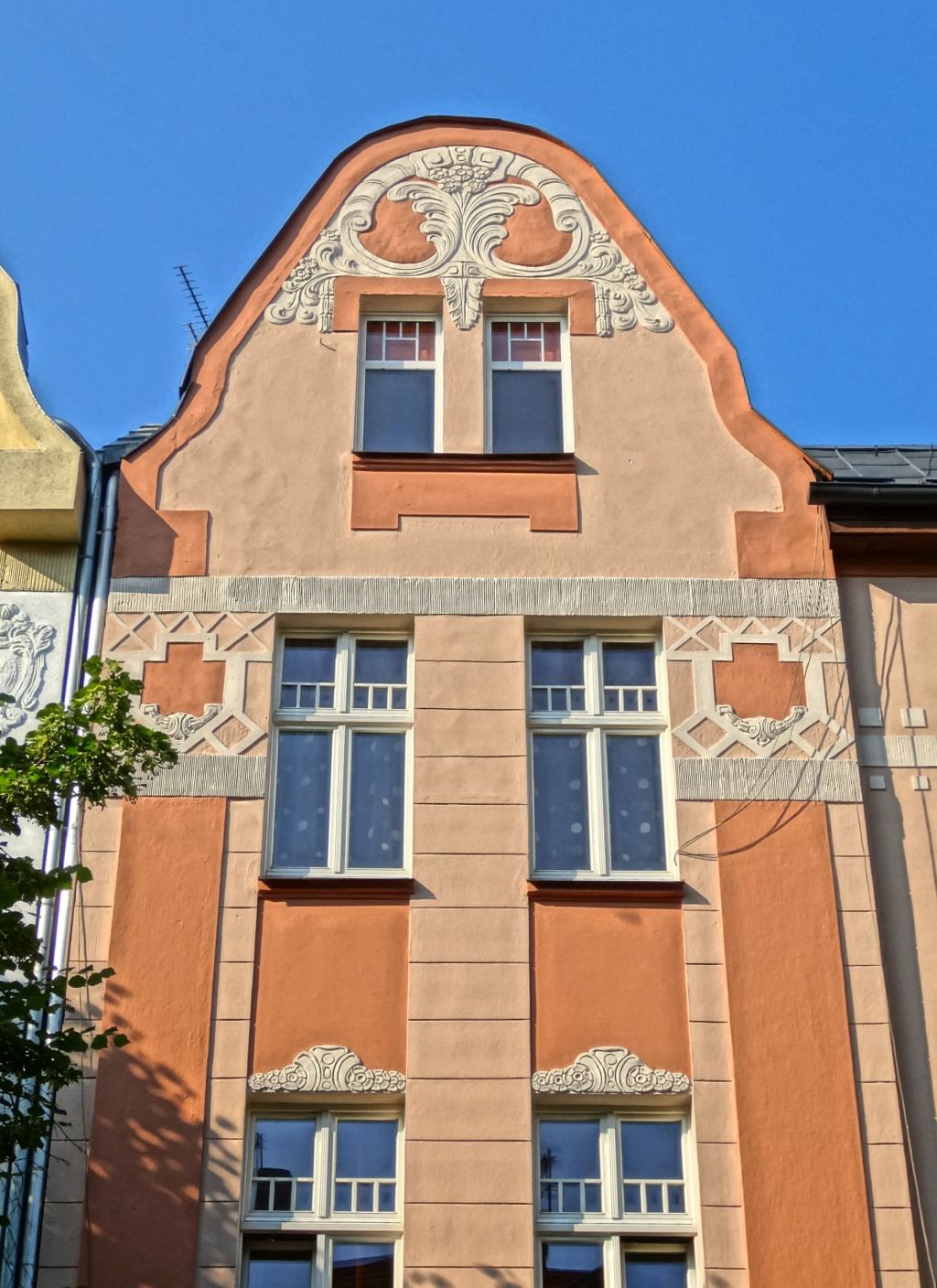
Details of Art Nouveau motifs

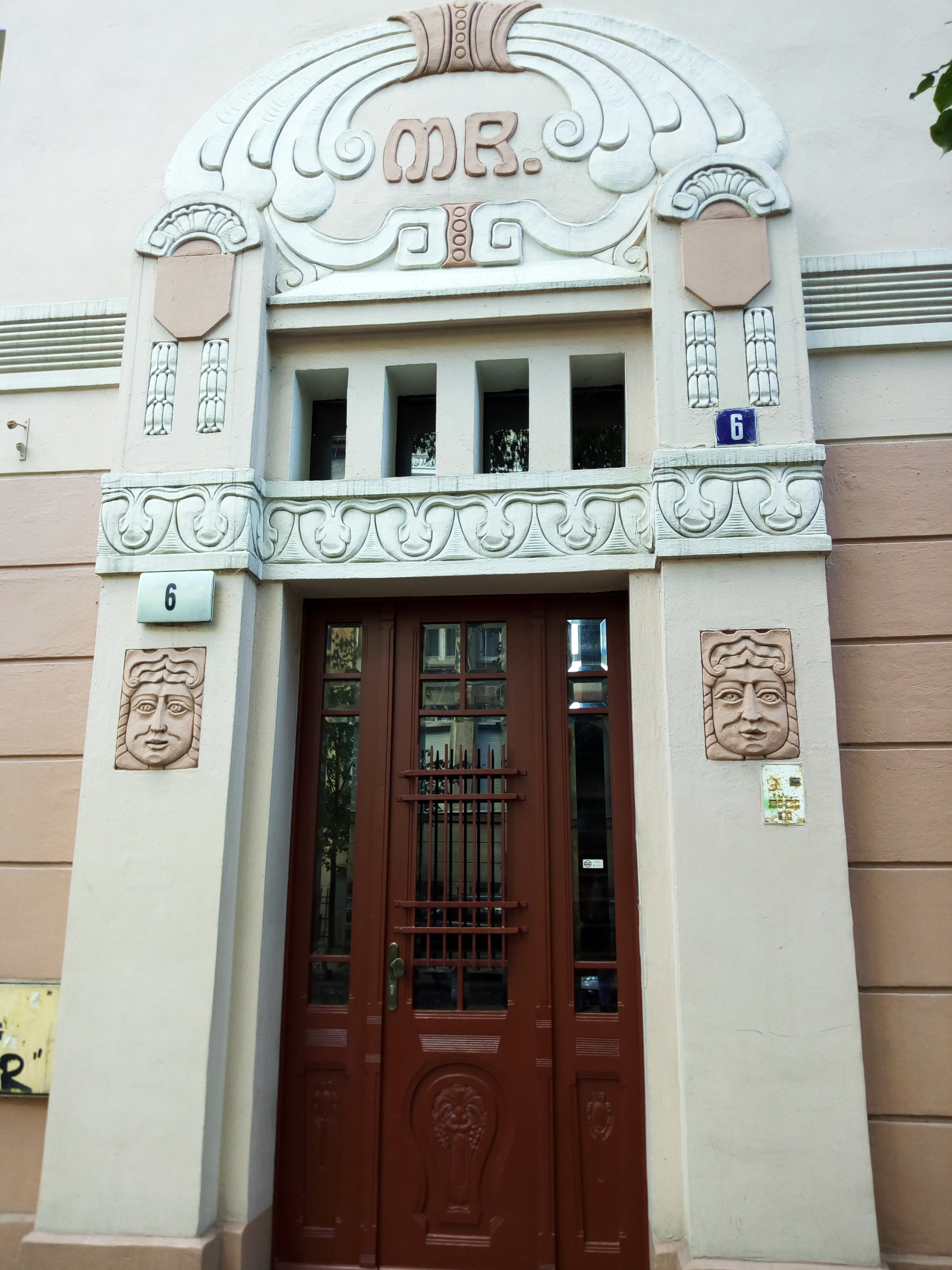
Ornamented portal with MK initials

Tenement at 8

1909, by Viktor Petrikowski

Art Nouveau

This tenement had been commissioned by Max Reschke, a wood factory entrepreneur, and designed by Victor Petrikowski, also builder and owner of the house at Nr.4. Reschke was living at the time at Goethe Straße 26 (today's 20 Stycznia 1920 Street 22), but kept ownership of Zamoyskiego 8 until the end of WWI. On 7 July 1920, famous Polish actress Pola Negri bought the place to live there in a luxury apartment refurbished to her taste until May 1922. In July of the same year, she sold the building to Marta Czaplewska who owned it till the outbreak of WWII. From 1921 to 1922, Wanda Gentil-Tippenhauer (1899–1965) a Polish painter, a passionate skier and a Tatra Mountains devotee lived there with her mother and sister.

The entire building has undergone a thorough refurbishing in 2017–2018, thanks for which one can admire the richness of the original architectural details. Art Nouveau elements are particularly noticeable around the elaborate adornment of the portal, displaying motifs, patterns, masks and floral items up to the transom light. At the top of the transom, the initials MR for Max Reschke are still visible, as they are in the abutting portal at Nr.6.

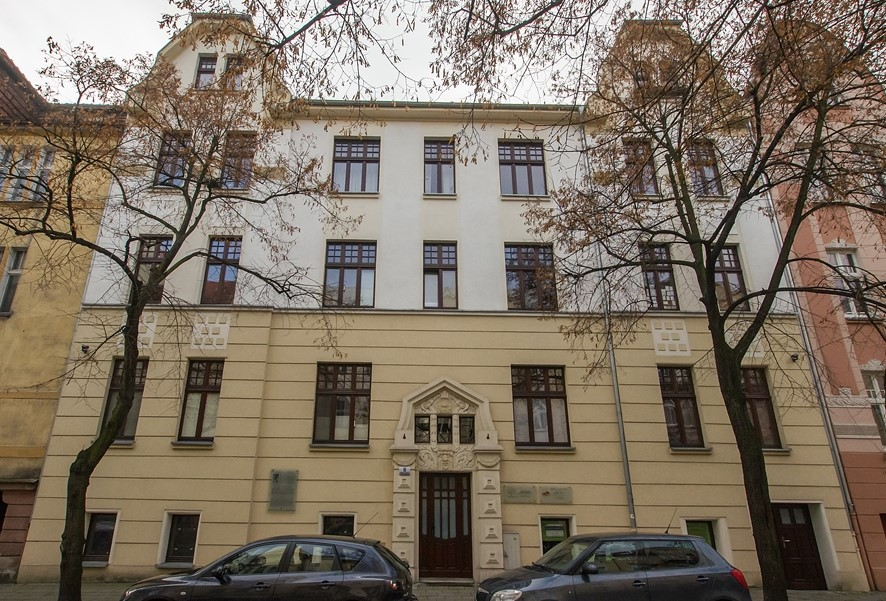
Facade from the street

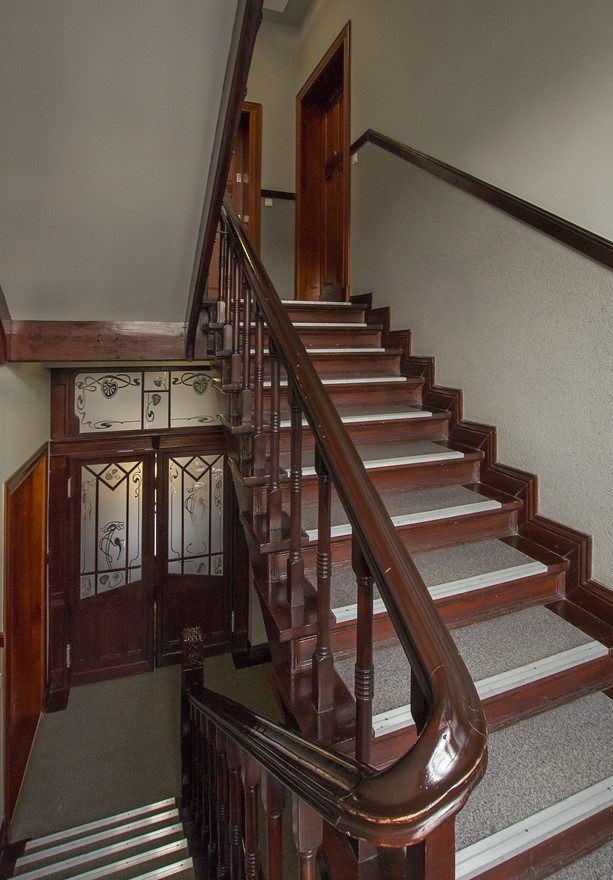
Details of Art Nouveau interiors

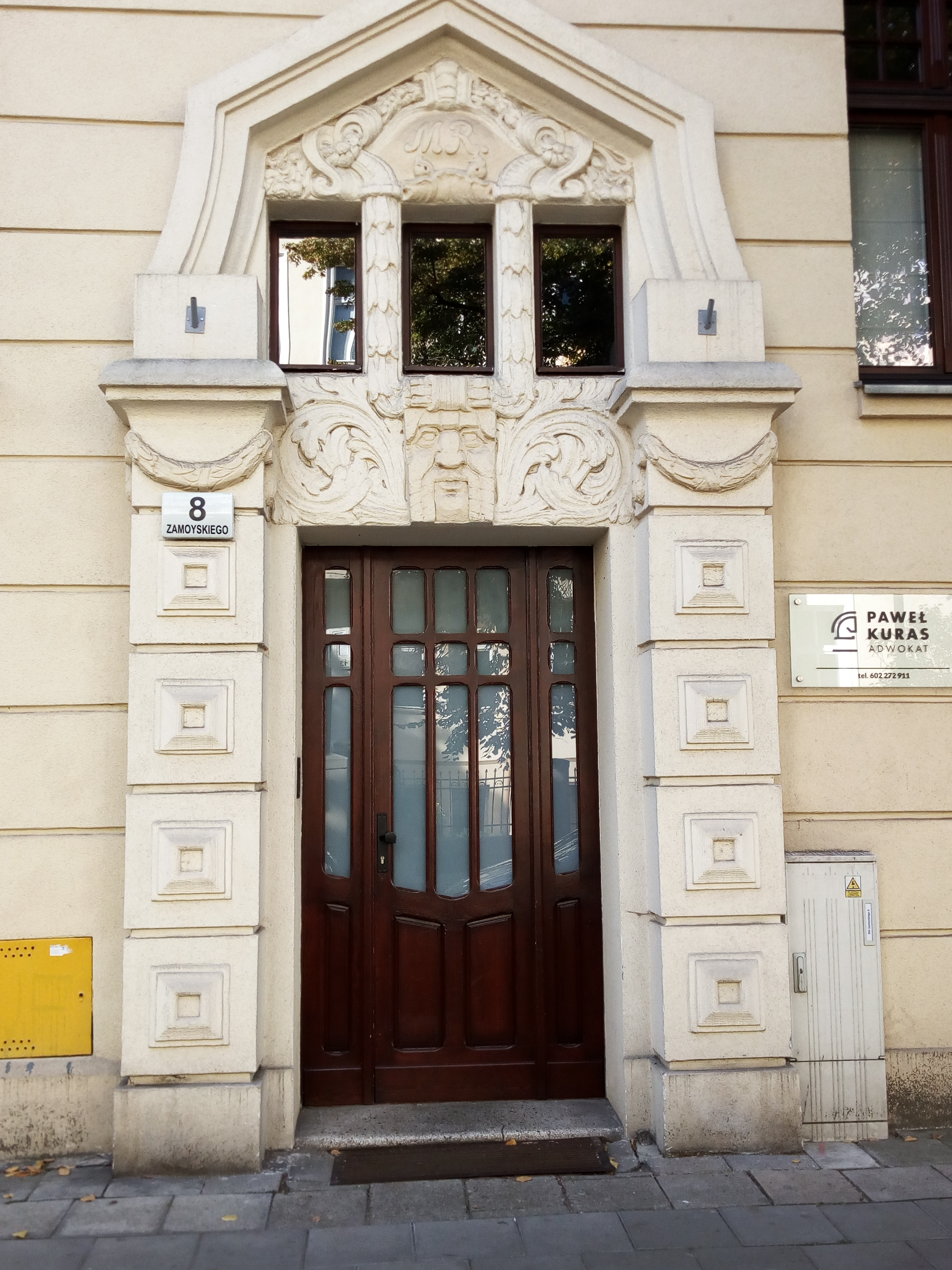
Ornamented portal bearing MR initials

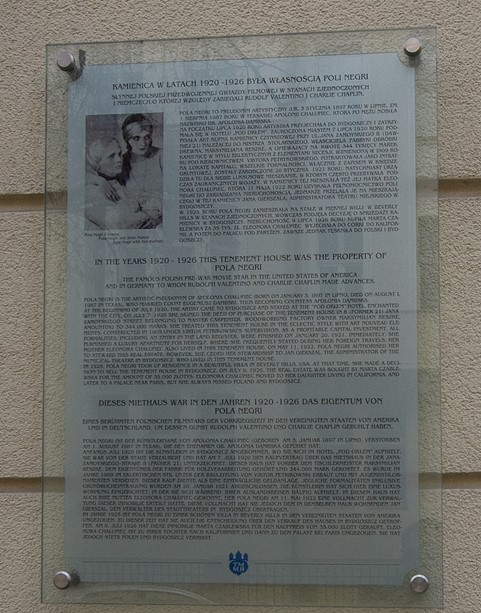
Plaque in memoriam of Pola Negri

Tenement at 9, corner with 16 20 Stycznia 1920 Street

Registered on Kuyavian-Pomeranian Voivodeship heritage list, Nr.A/1628/1-2 (February 25,)

1910, by Rudolf Kern

Art Nouveau

The building was first the property of the architect who realized it, Rudolf Kern, one of the leading designers in the early 20th century in Bydgoszcz (then called Bromberg).

This immense edifice, at the crossing with Zamoyskiego street, reveals in particular a large metal roof studded with a corner finial, dormers, a terrace crowning the avant-corps which bottom is pierced by arches to make room for the majestic main entry area. The portal arch is covered on the inside with coffers and displays oval shaped openings so specific to Art Nouveau features.

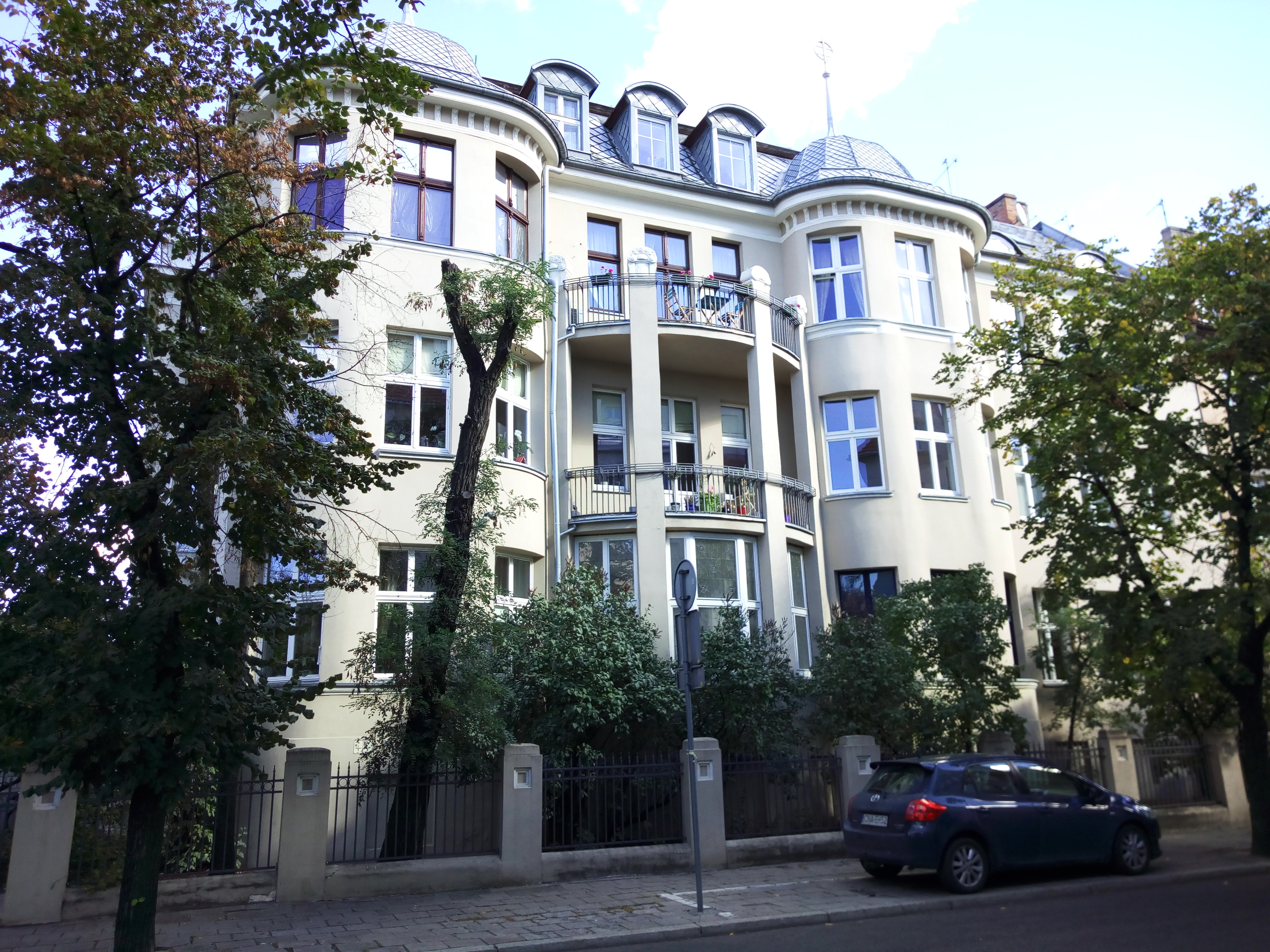
Facade onto Zamoyskiego street

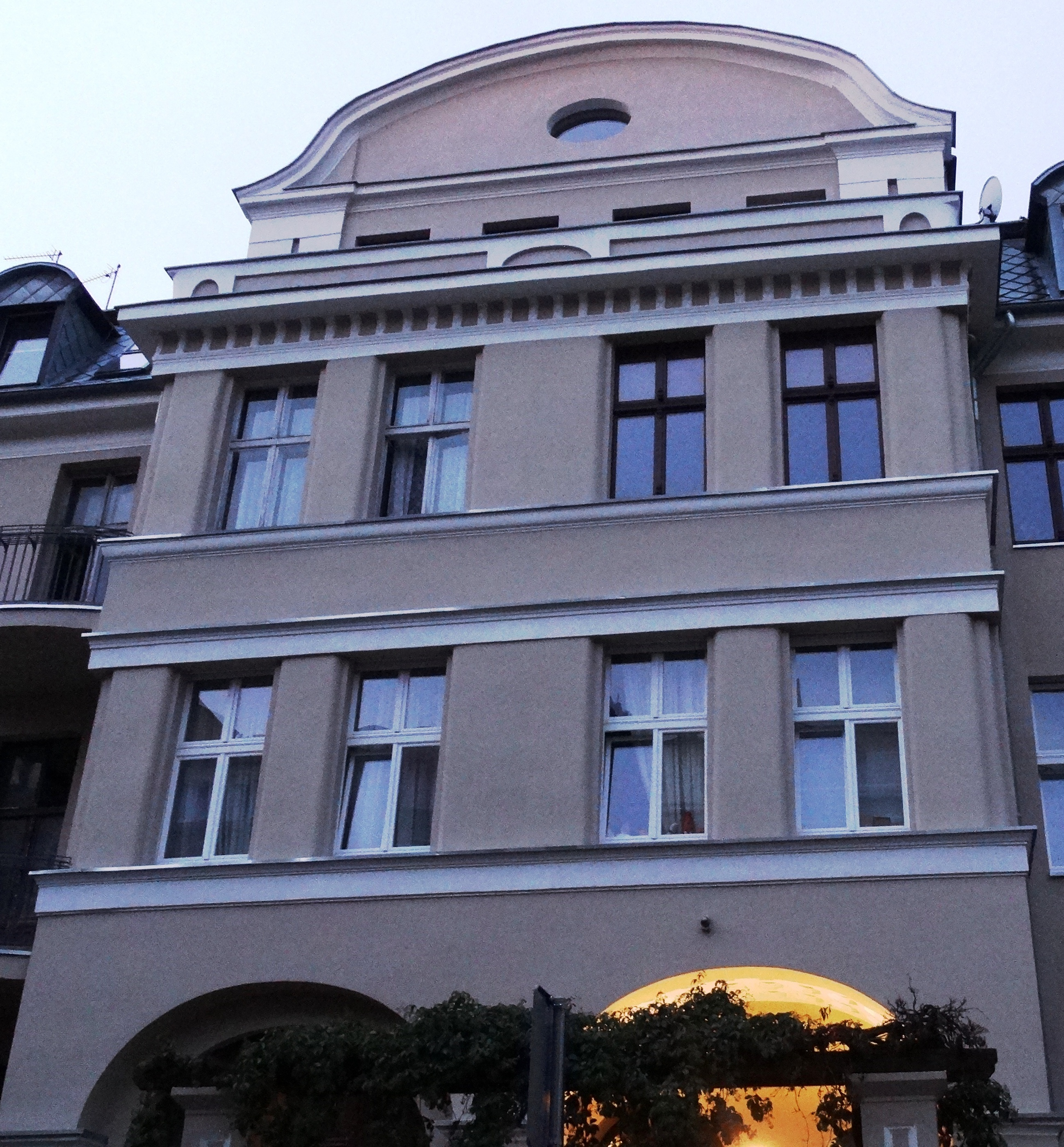
Avant-corps

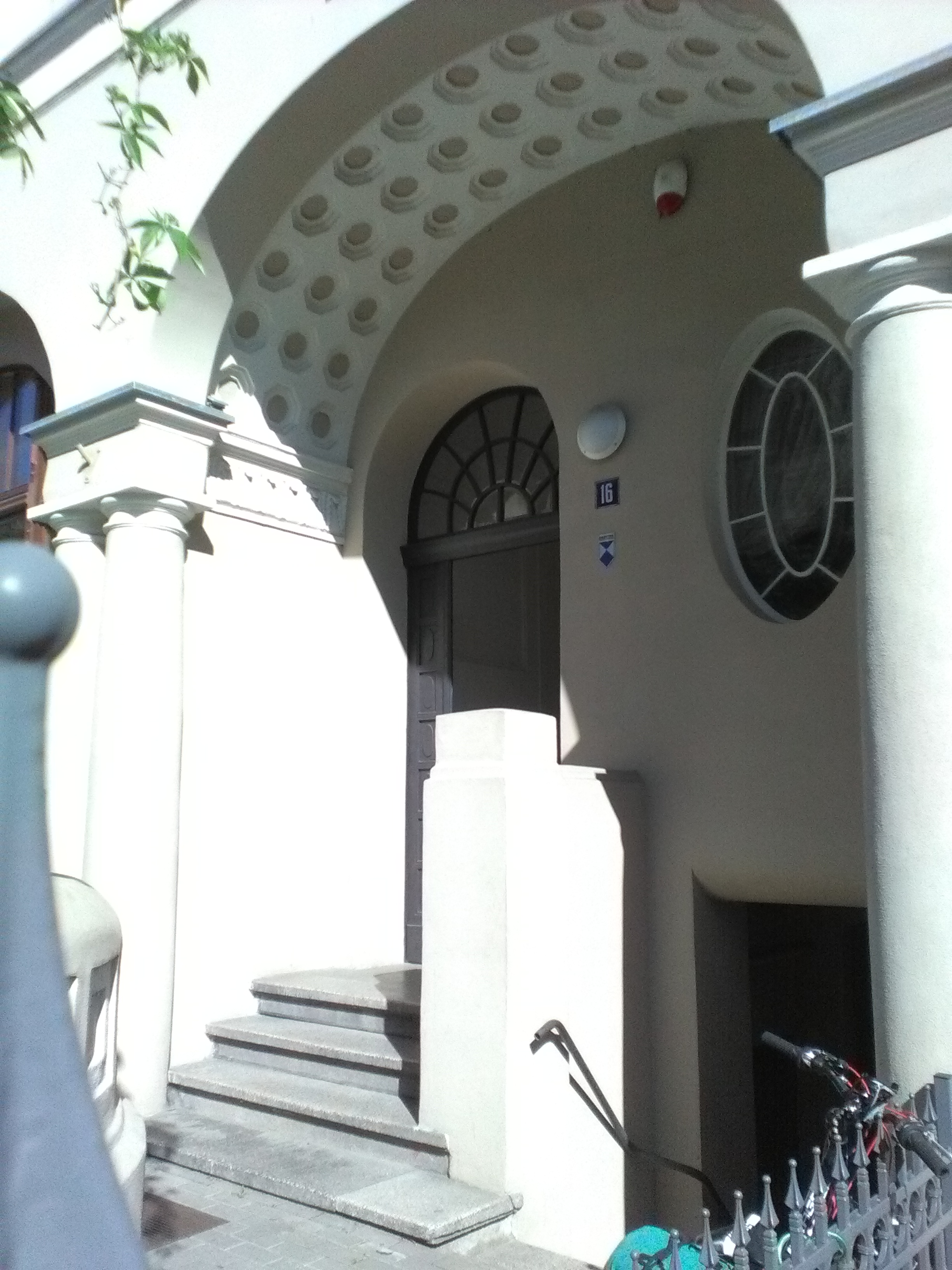
Adorned portal after renovation

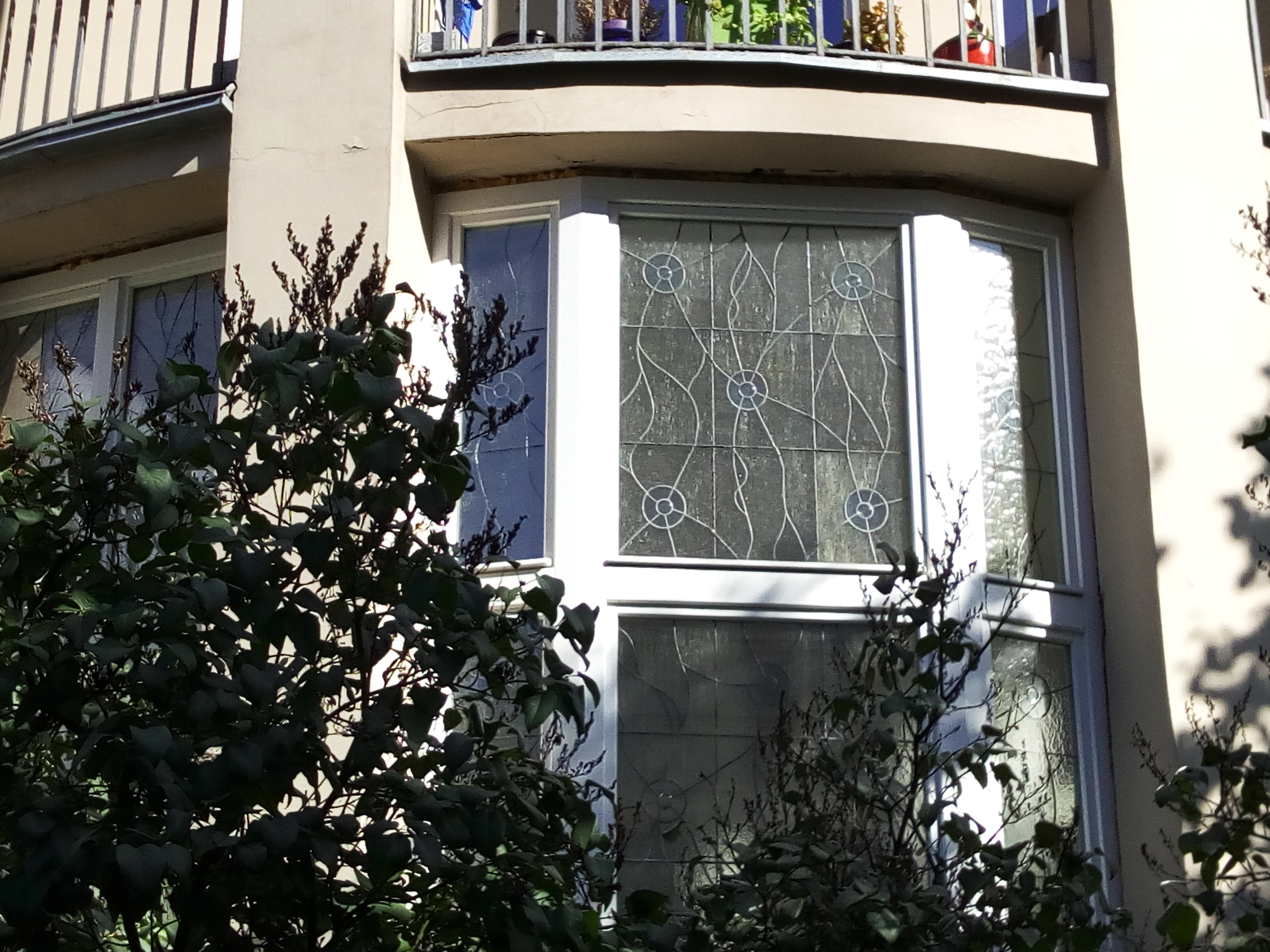
Stained glass window

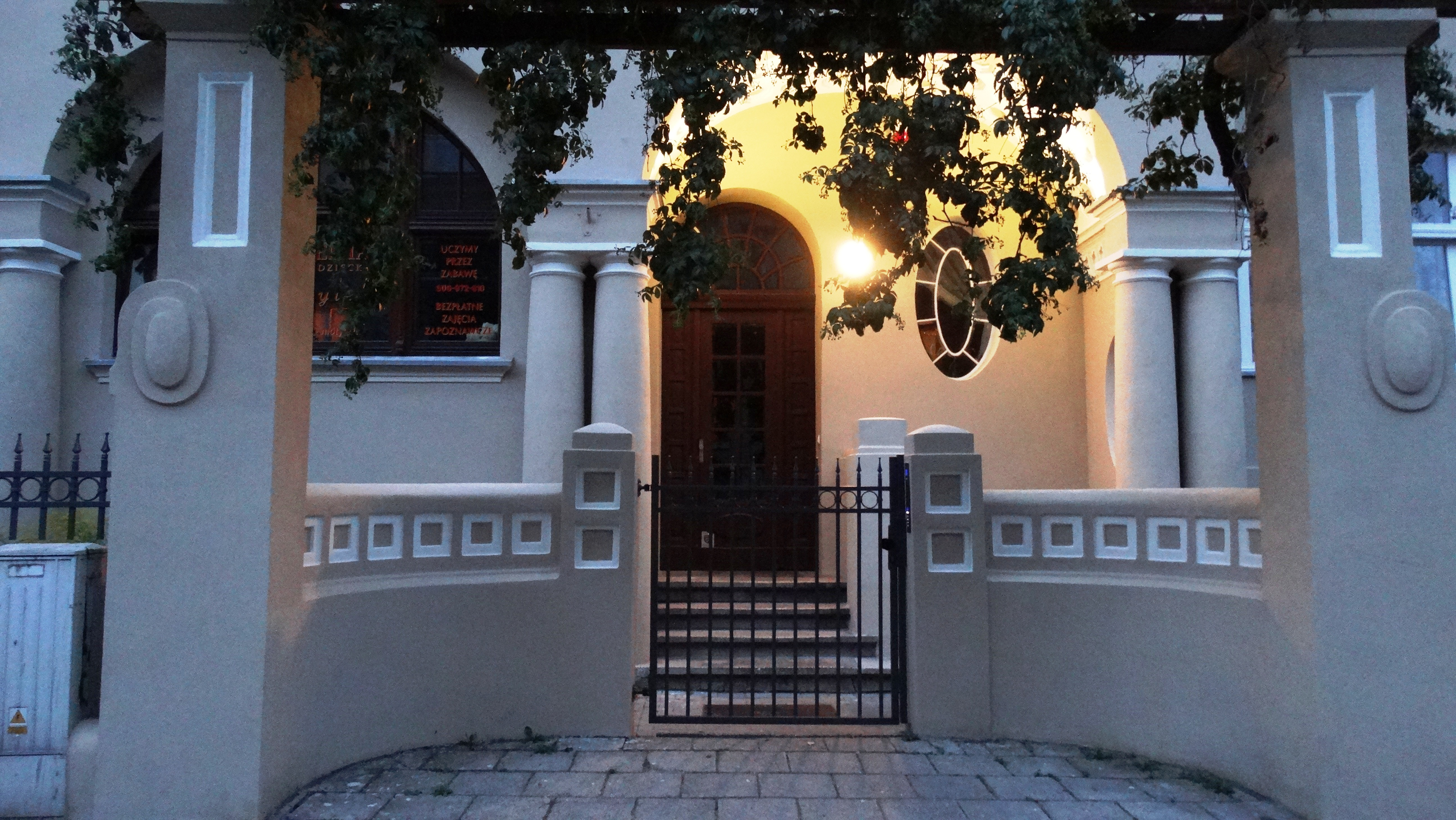
Renovated portal

Tenement at 10, corner with 11 Paderewskiego Street

1910, by O.M.W. Müller

Art Nouveau

First landlord was a merchant, Julius Lüdtke.

This tenement is decorated with Art Nouveau details and motifs, on both facades: pillars on avant-corps decorated with festoons, a portal adorned with floral motifs up to the oeil-de-boeuf, a round avant-corps topped with a frieze near the corner and as much decoration on the other elevation with bay windows and a second ornamented gate.

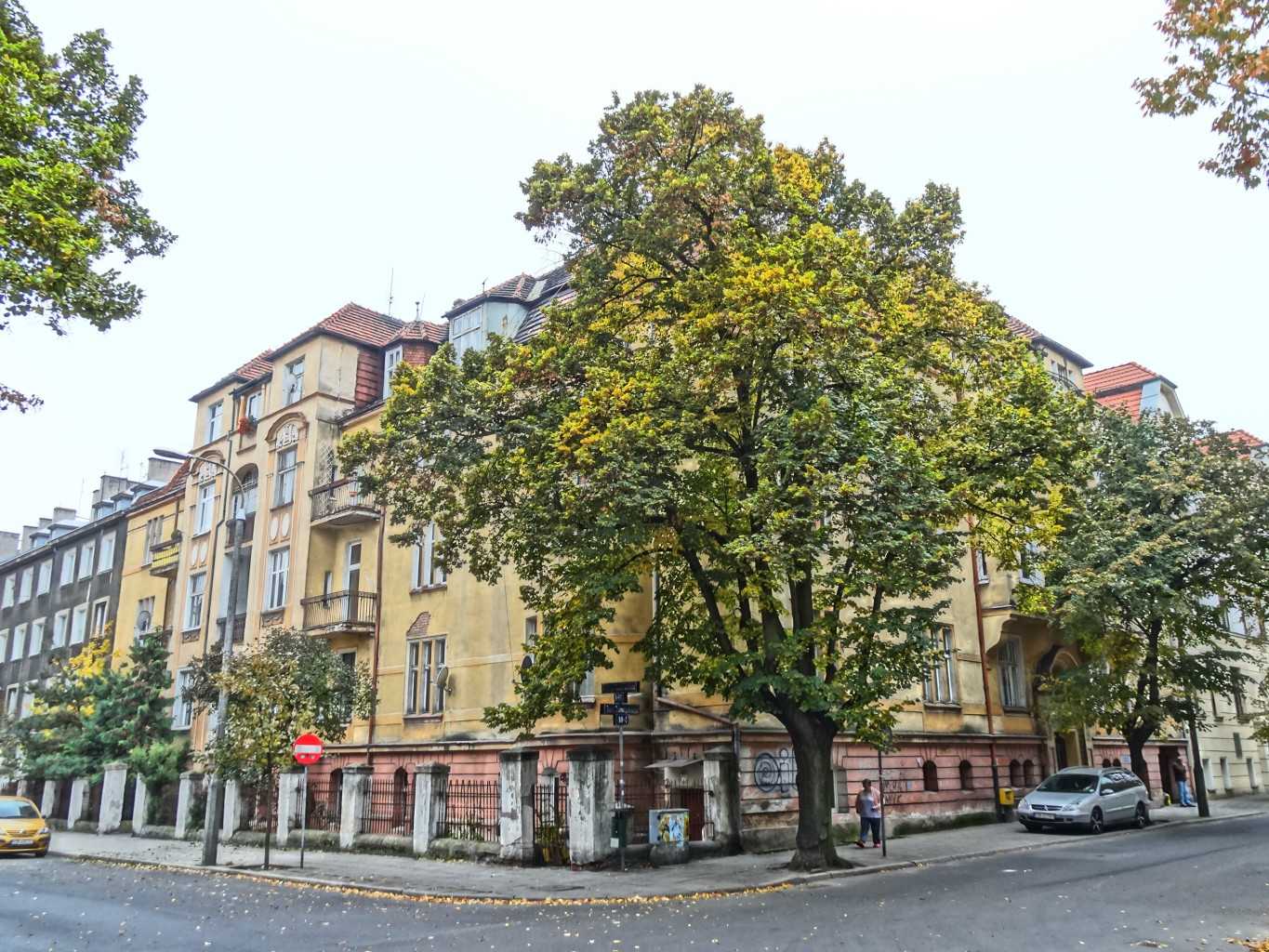
View of both facades

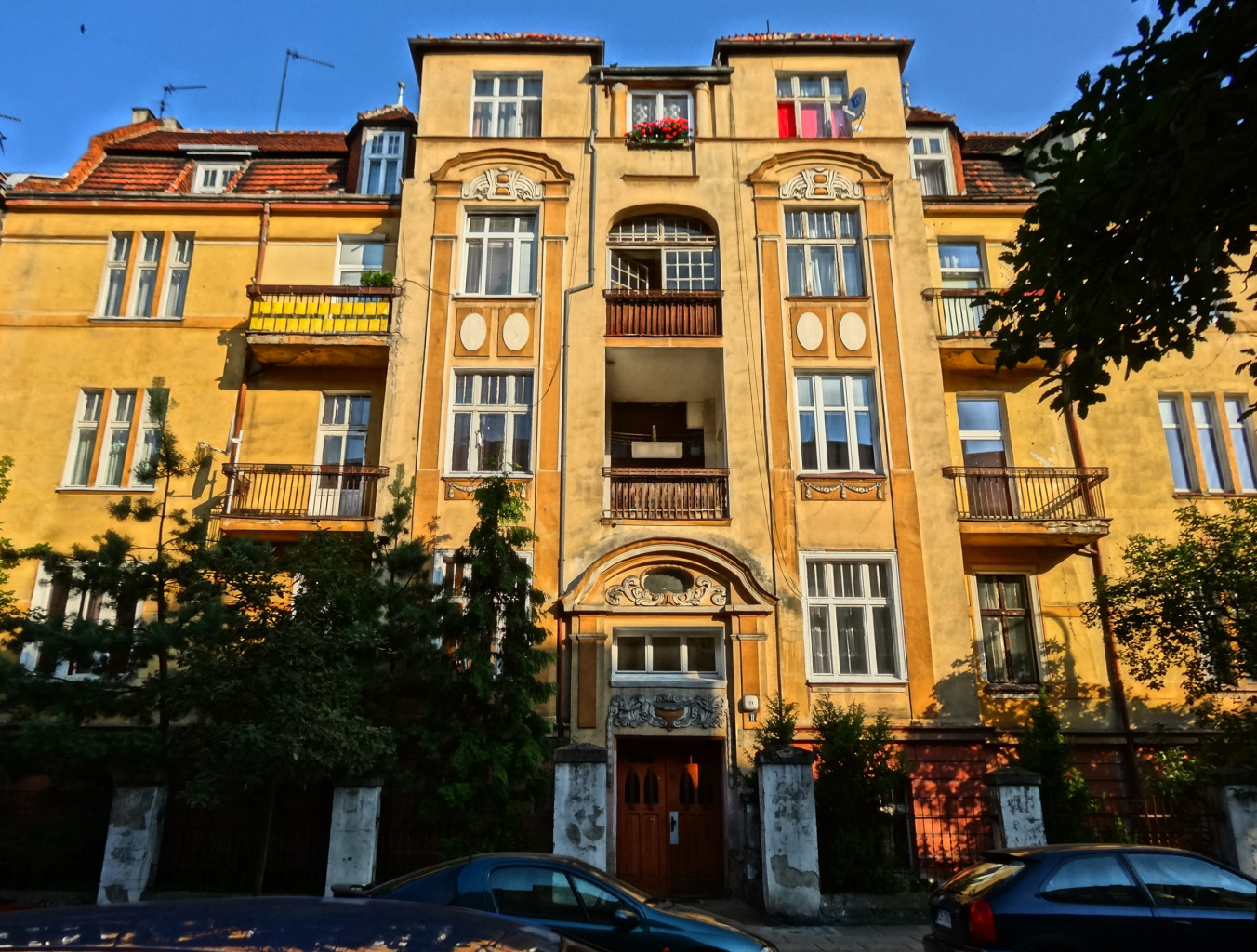
Avant-corps and main entry on Paderewskiego street

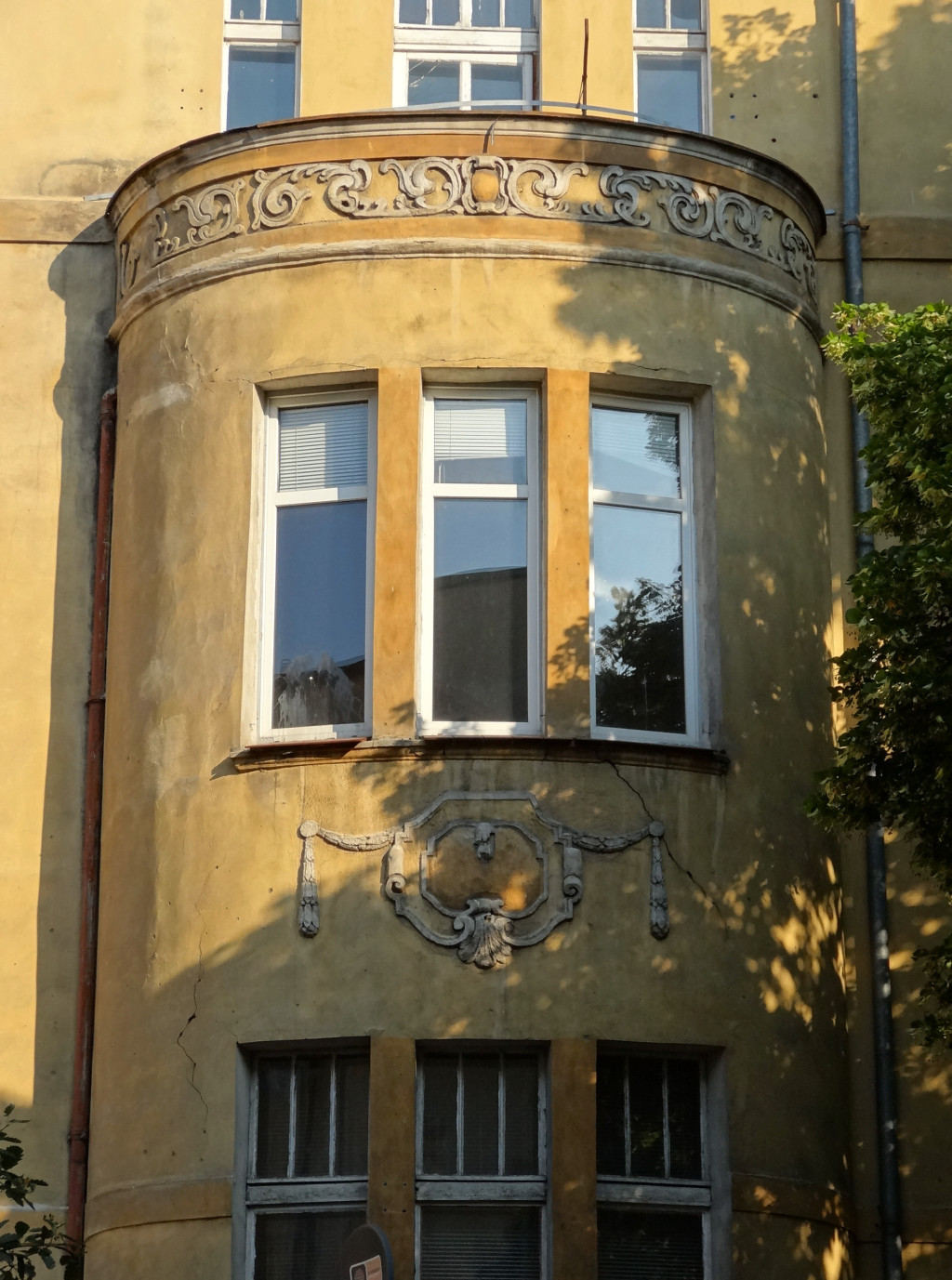
Details of motifs

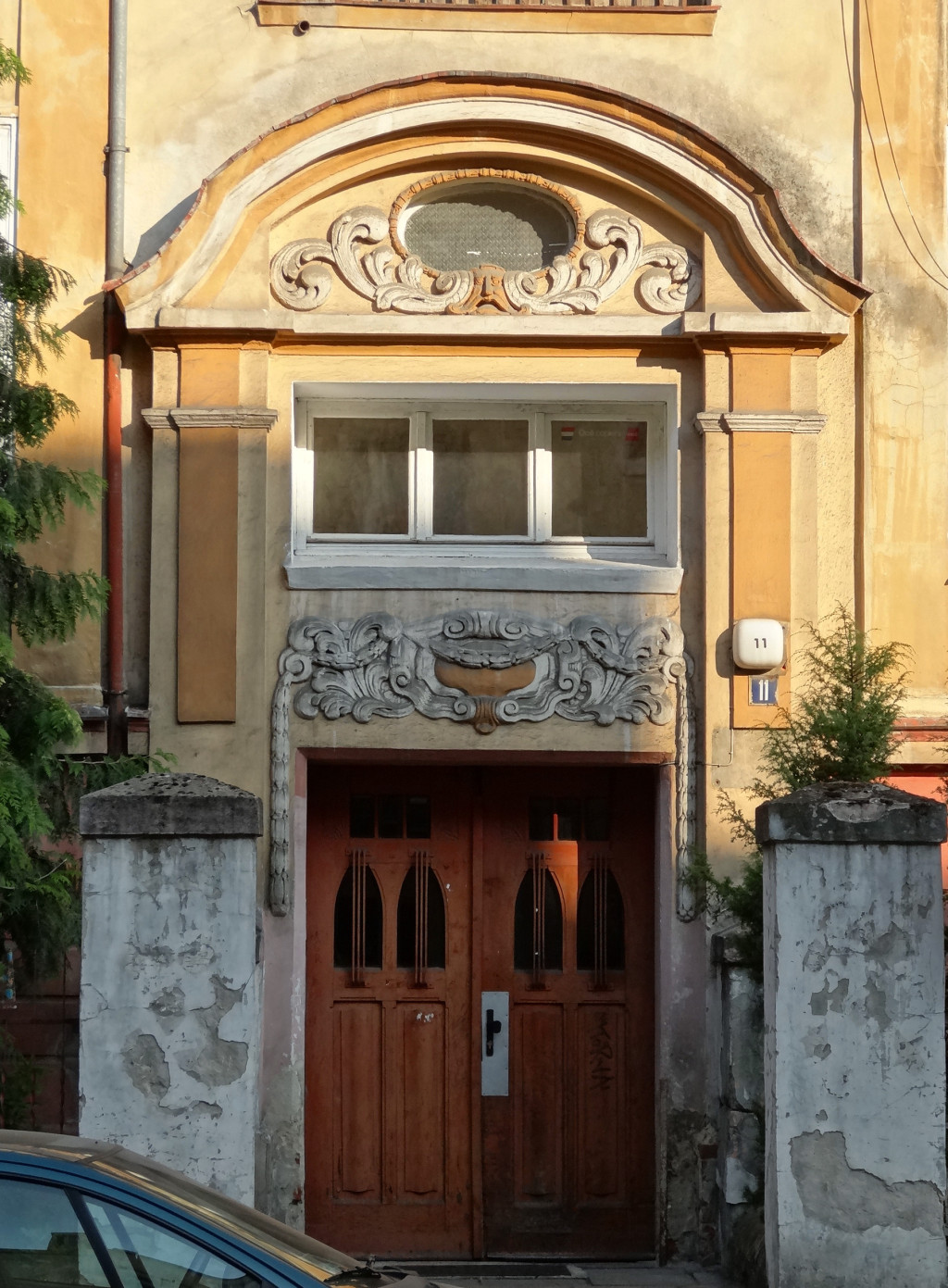
Details of the portal on Paderewksiego street

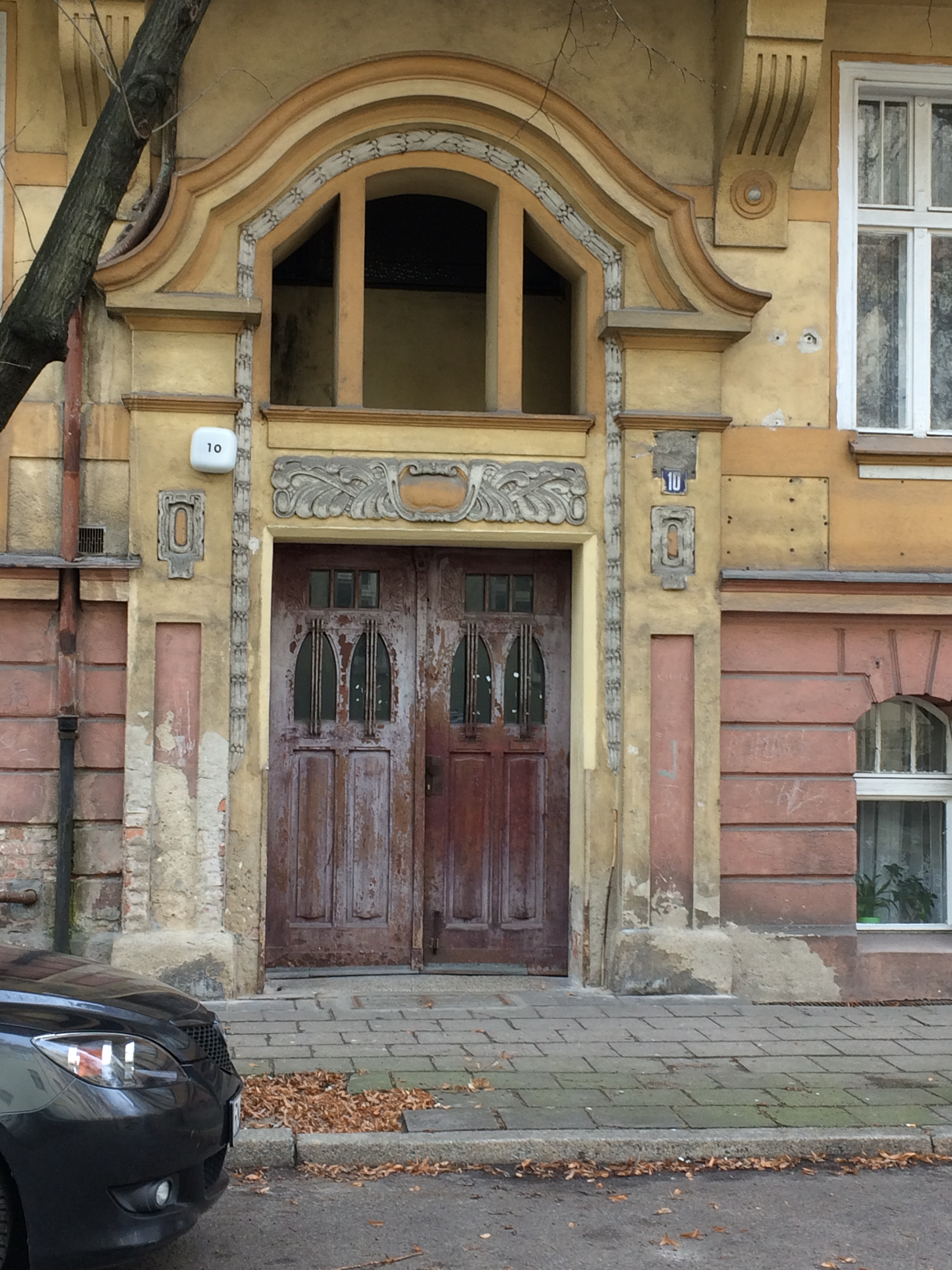
Gate on Zamoyskiego street

Tenement at 11

1910, by Rudolf Kern

Late Art Nouveau

On the plot owned by Hermann Draheim, a rentier, Rudolf Kern designed this tenement in 1910. At the time, Rudolf Kern was a well-established architect who had realized numerous buildings in the area, be it villas (e.g. Paderewskiego Street 4) or tenement houses (e.g. August Mentzel Tenement, Julius Grey house).

The large building boasts fading Art Nouveau elements that could deserve some refurbishing. One can still appreciate the twin avant-corps flanking the entry and crowned by a large terrace. The lot is topped by a wide circular gable, bearing an oeil-de-boeuf and a stuccoed friezes. The quality of the decoration of the portal is worth a stop, with Art Nouveau motifs, friezes, stained glass acting as transom over the delicate wooden double door.

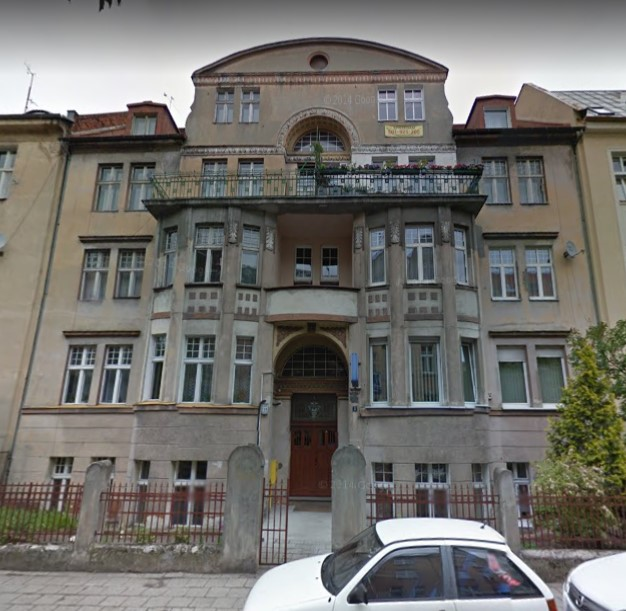
Facade from the street

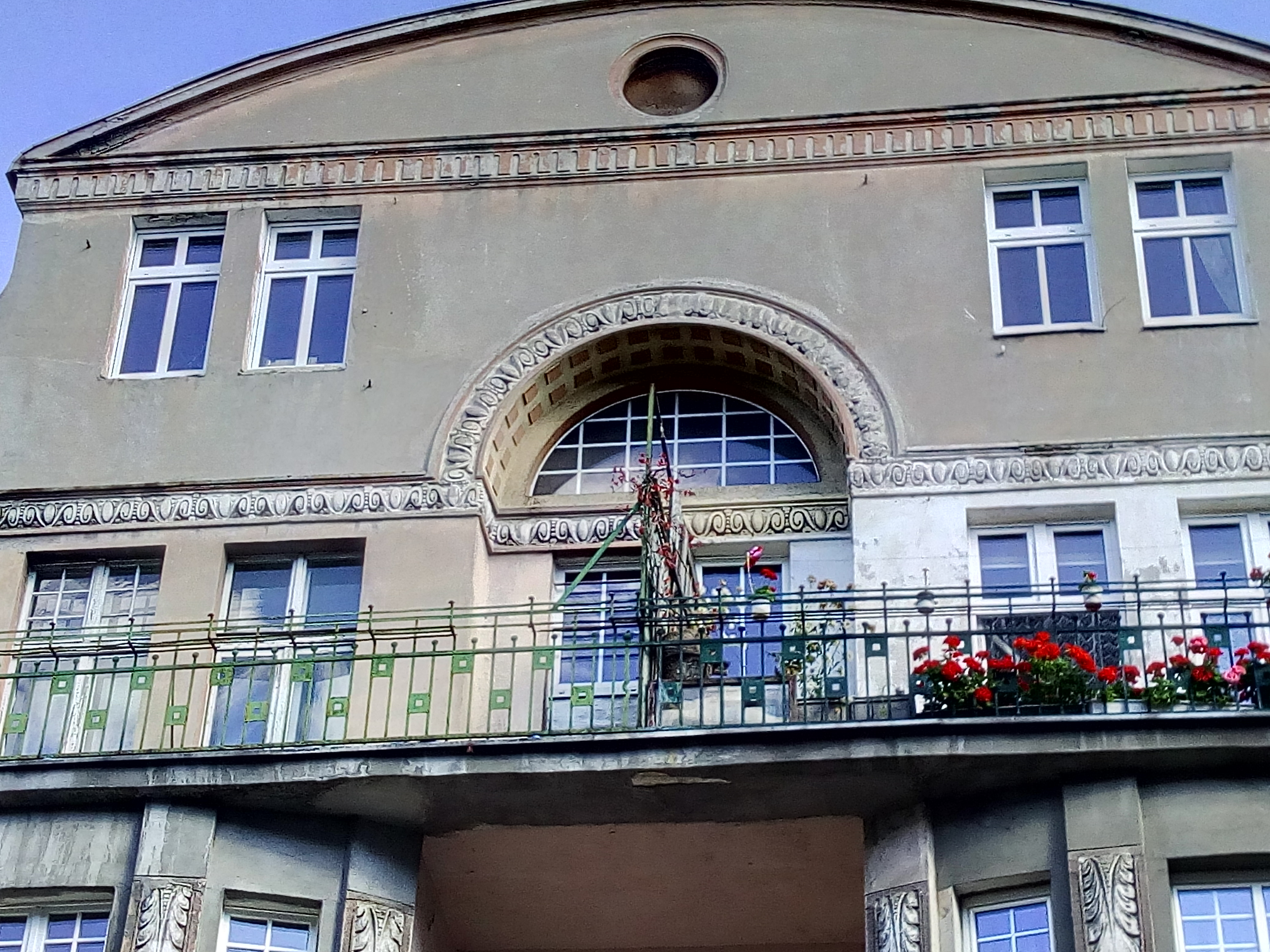
Details of the gabble

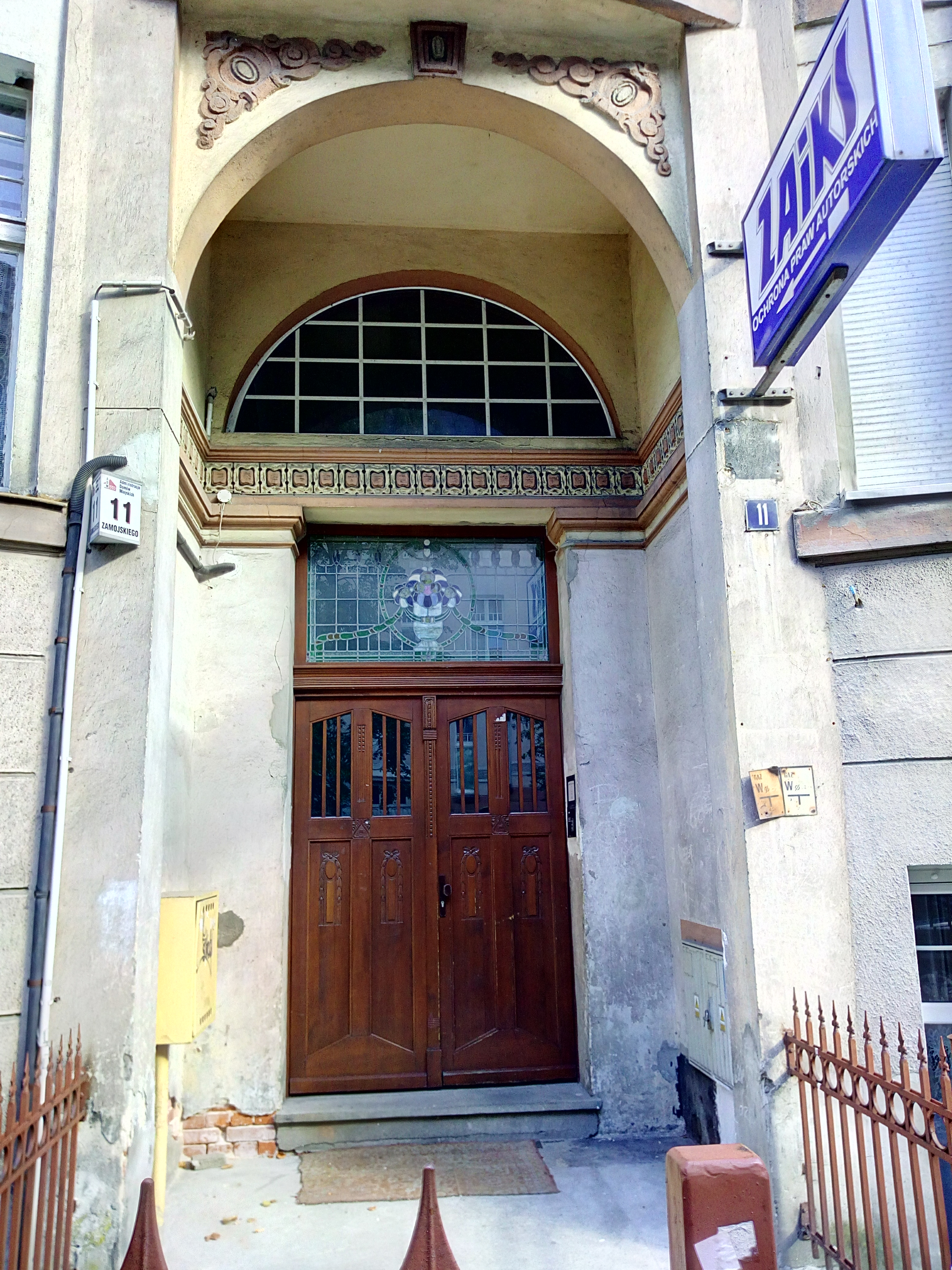
Ornamented portal

Tenement at 13

1910–1911, by Rudolf Kern

Art Nouveau

Hermann Pflaum, a craftsman, commissioned Rudolf Kern to realize this edifice, at almost the same period as the neighbouring one at Nr.11. Original address was Stein straße 7.

The frontage displays a balanced architecture, with two symmetric avant-corps, each topped by a volute gable with oeil-de-boeuf and a large window giving onto a balcony. One is impressed by the number of openings on the facade: some of them are adorned with Art Nouveau floral motifs, masks or pilasters. Bay windows set in the middle of the avant-corps are capped by a metal roof. The main portal, although more sober than others in the street, still boasts pilasters on each side of a nicely crafted wooden-and-glass door with a transom light.

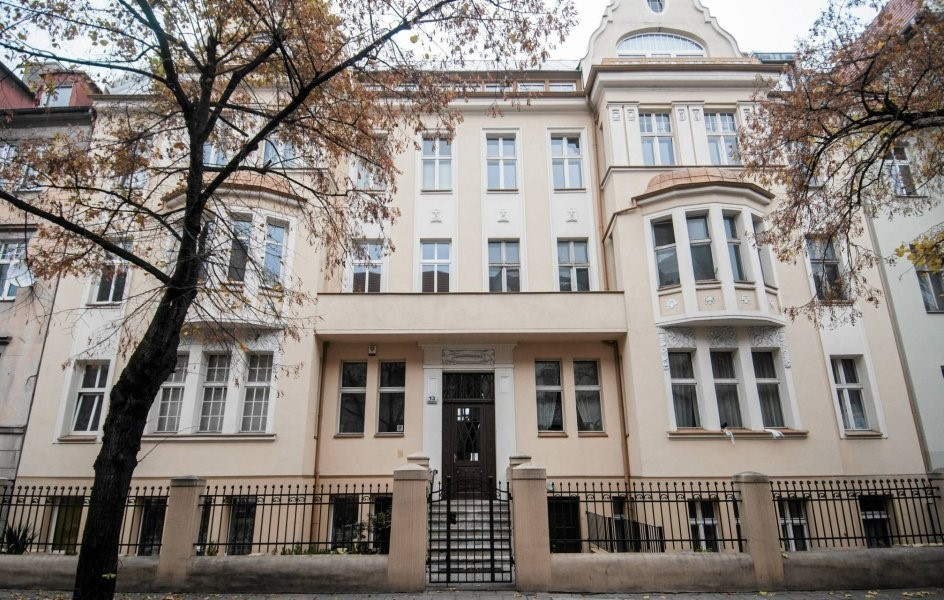
View from the street

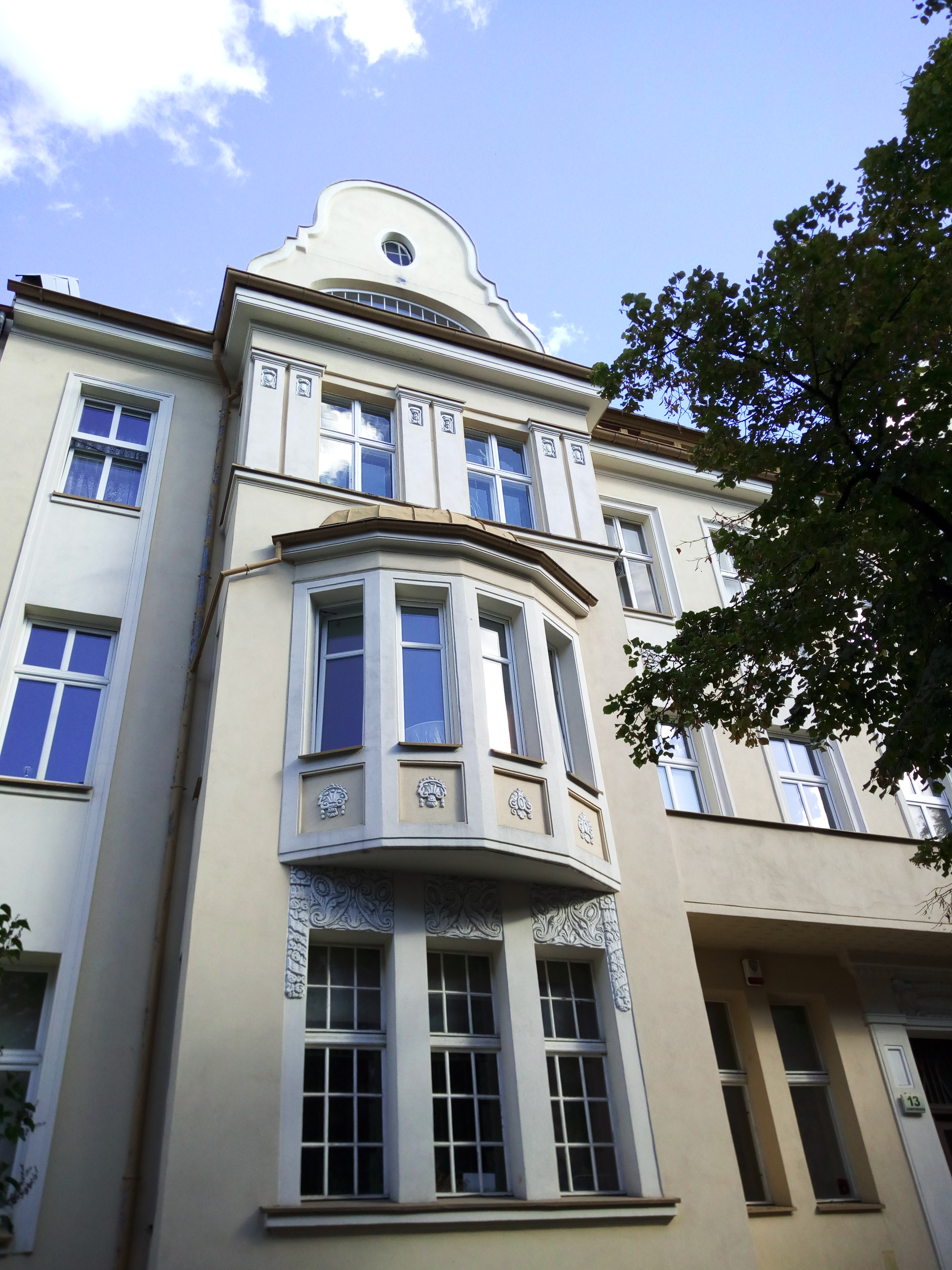
Details of a bay-window

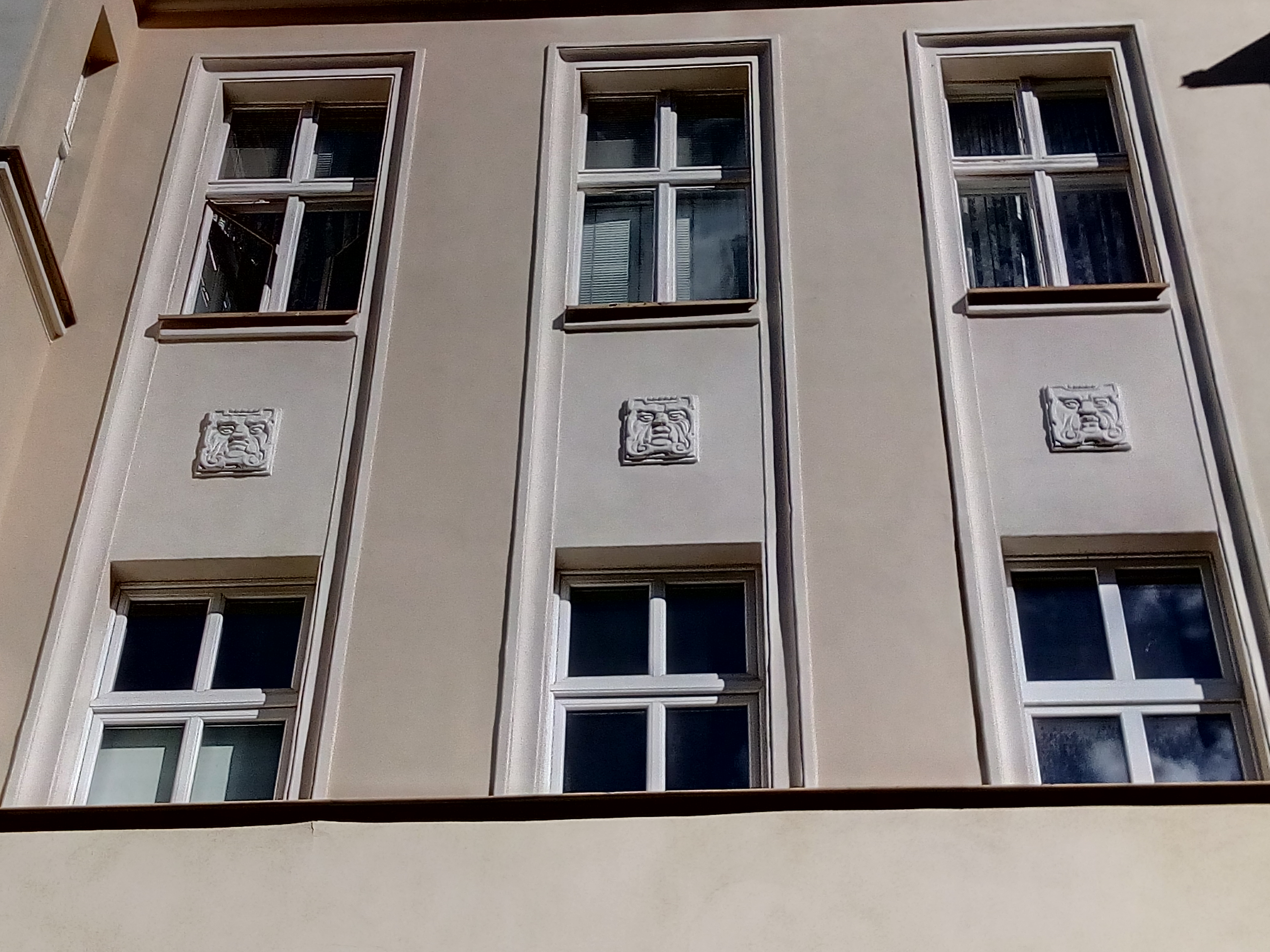
Art Nouveau ornamental masks

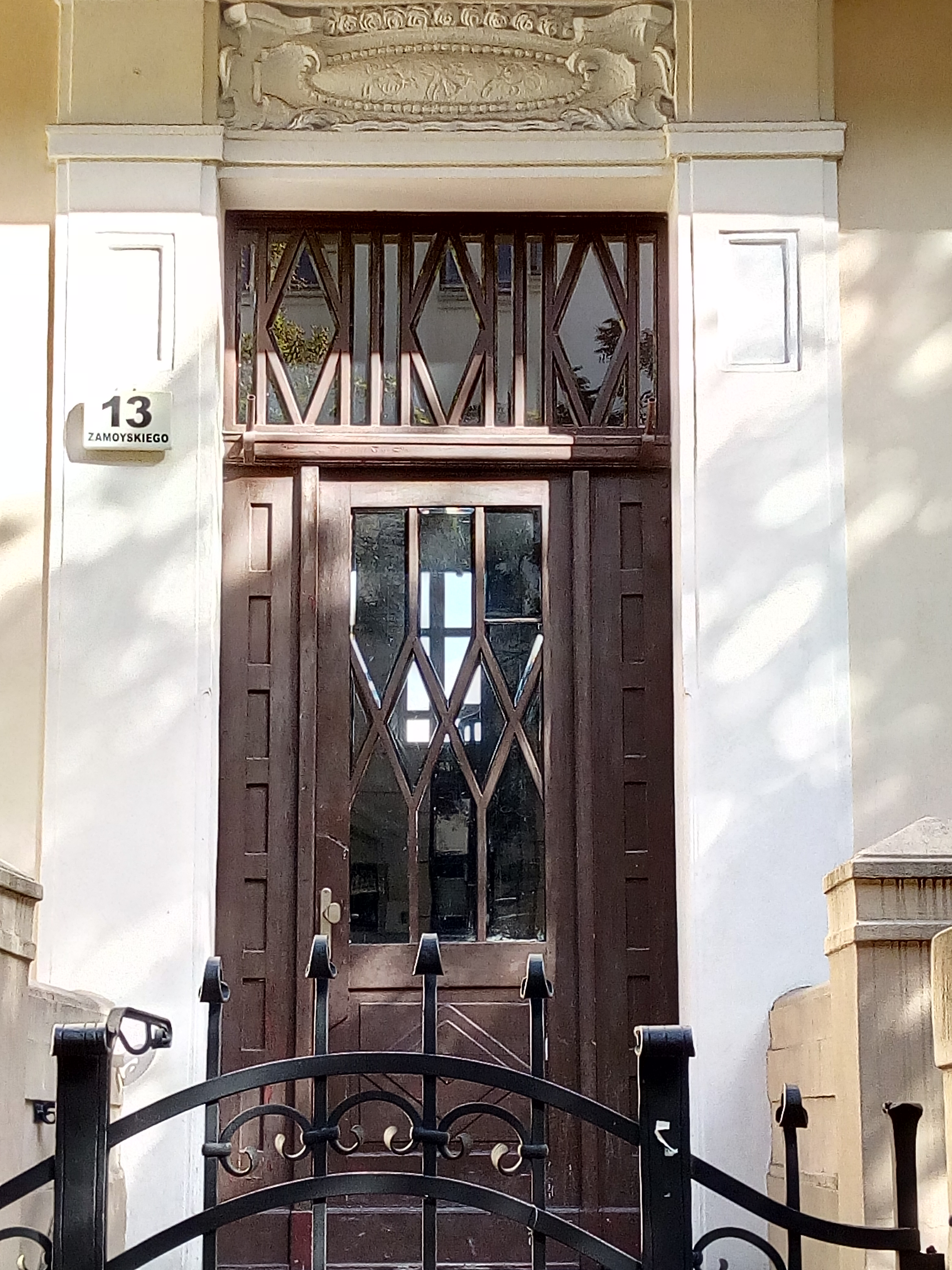
Main entry portal

Tenement at 15, corner with 13 Paderewskiego street

1910–1915, by Rudolf Kern

Art Nouveau, early Modern architecture

Investor for the project was Emil Heydemann. The first landlord, Ernst Richter, was working as a railway administration secretary.

Both elevations of this large building feature architectural elements transitioning to early modernism style: straight vertical lines are predominant and very few details recall the gone Art Nouveau style (e.g. adorned portals of both elevations, an eyelid dormer or oeil-de-boeuf on top of gable). The tenement has been refurbished in 2017.

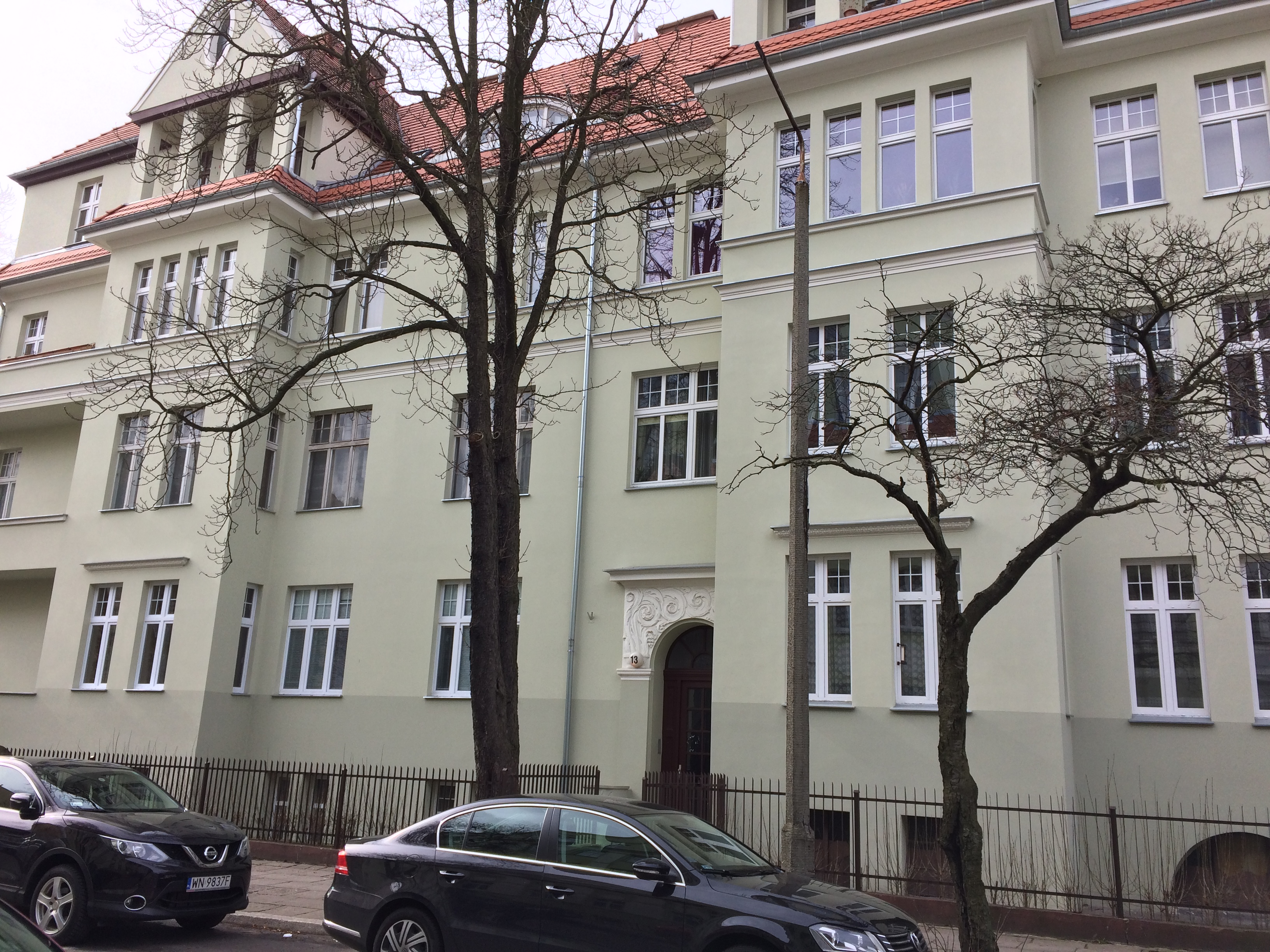
Facade on Paderewskiego street

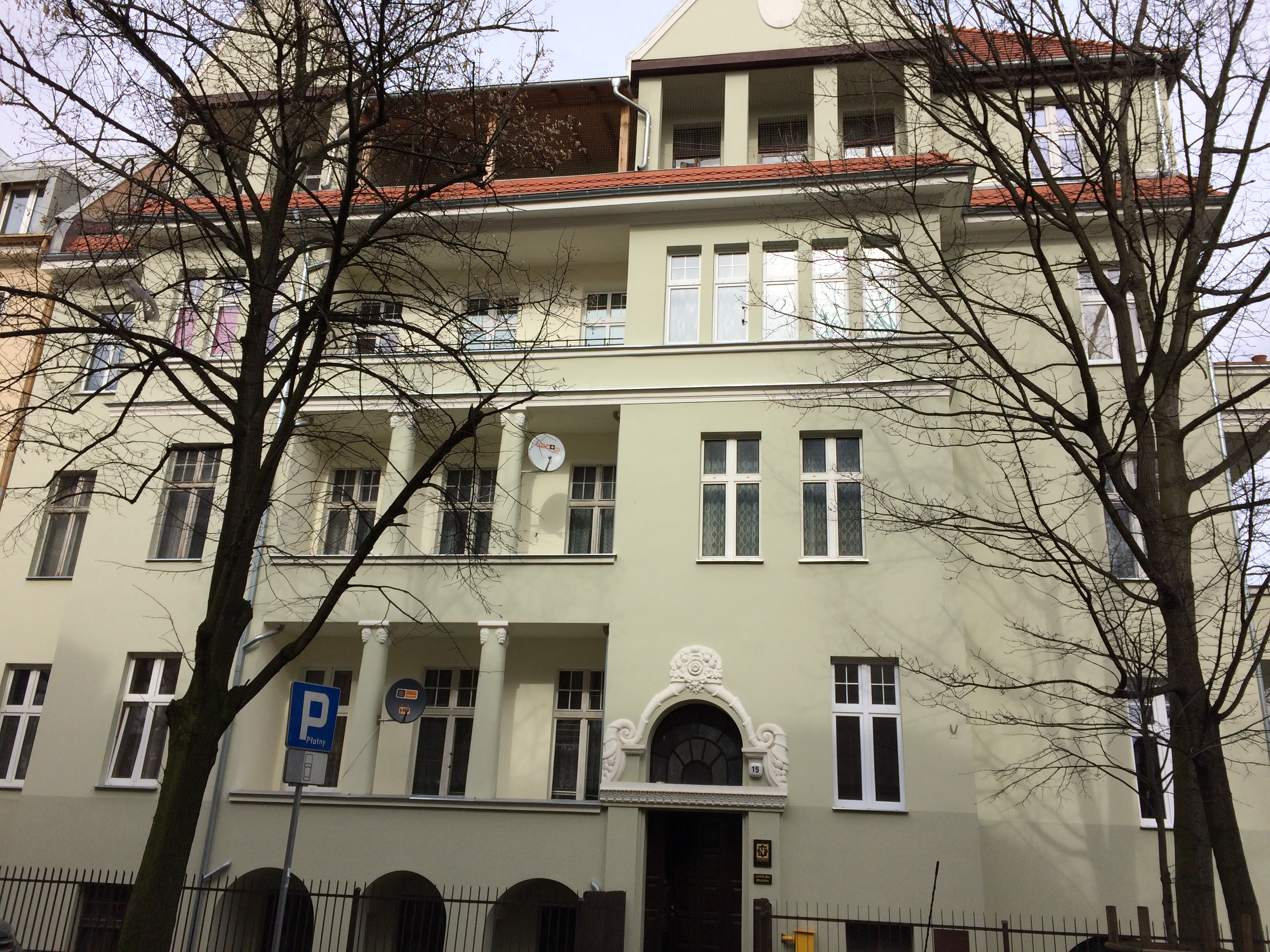
Frontage on Zamoyskiego street

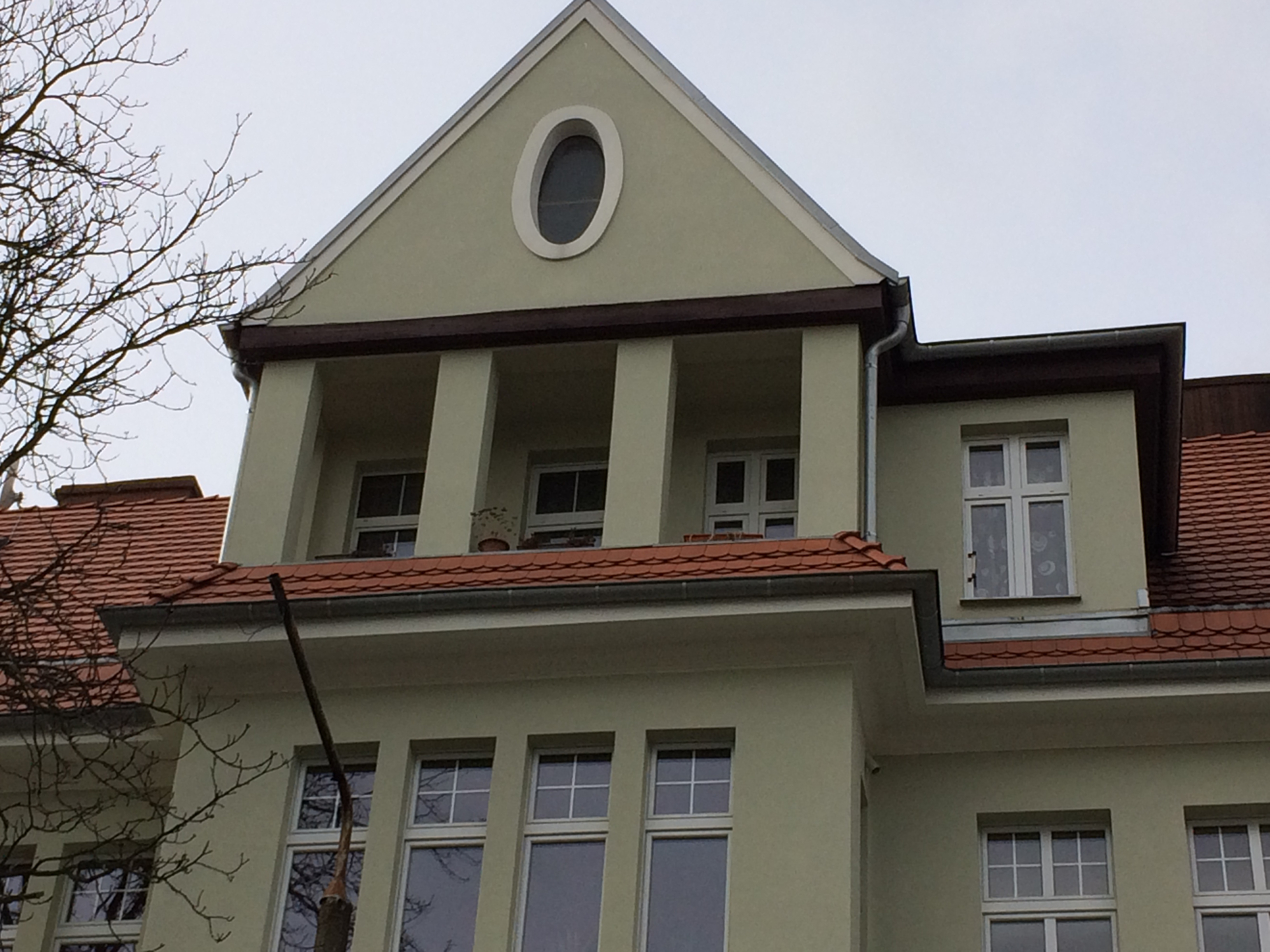
Gable and loggia

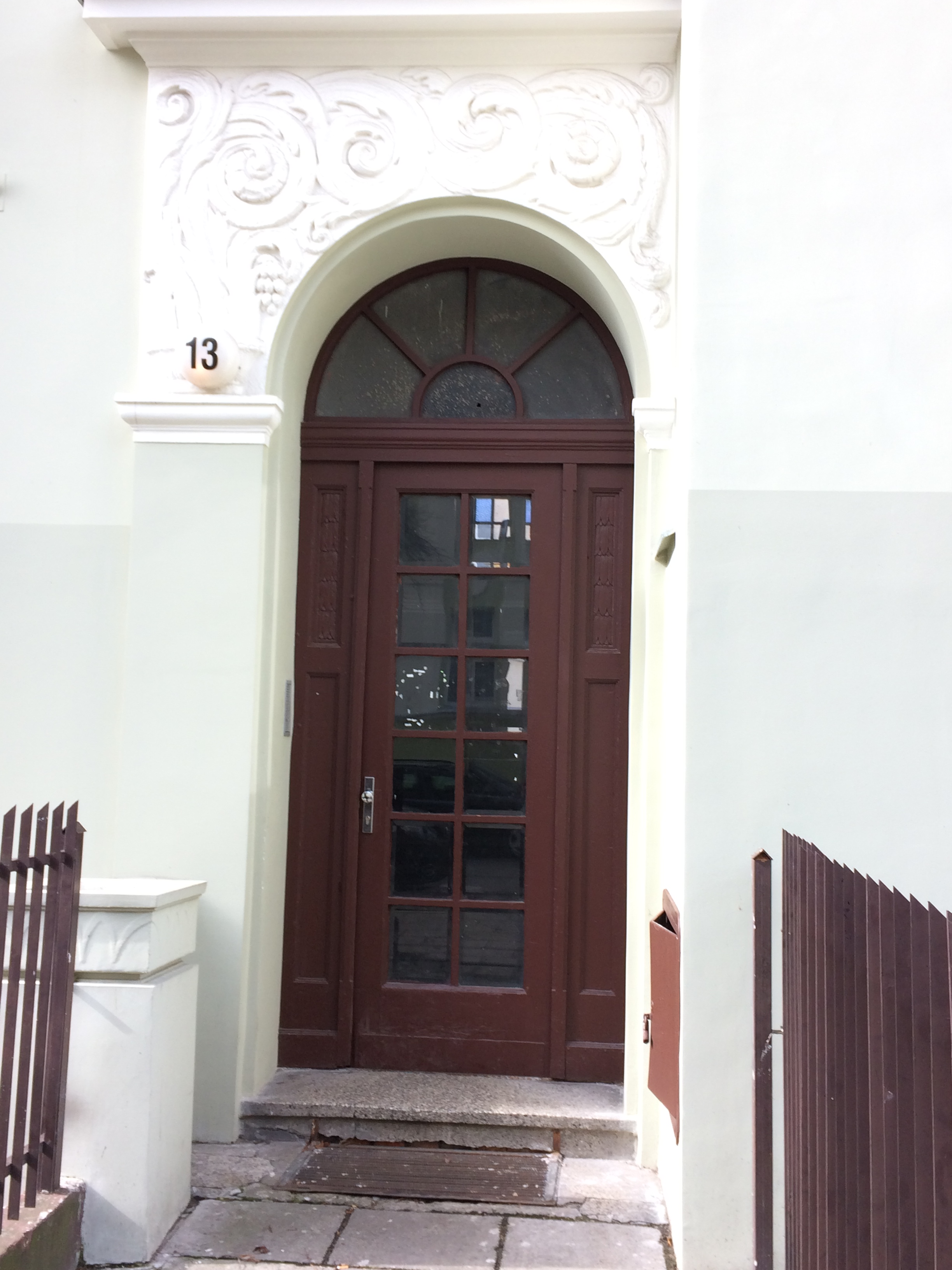
portal on Paderewskiego street

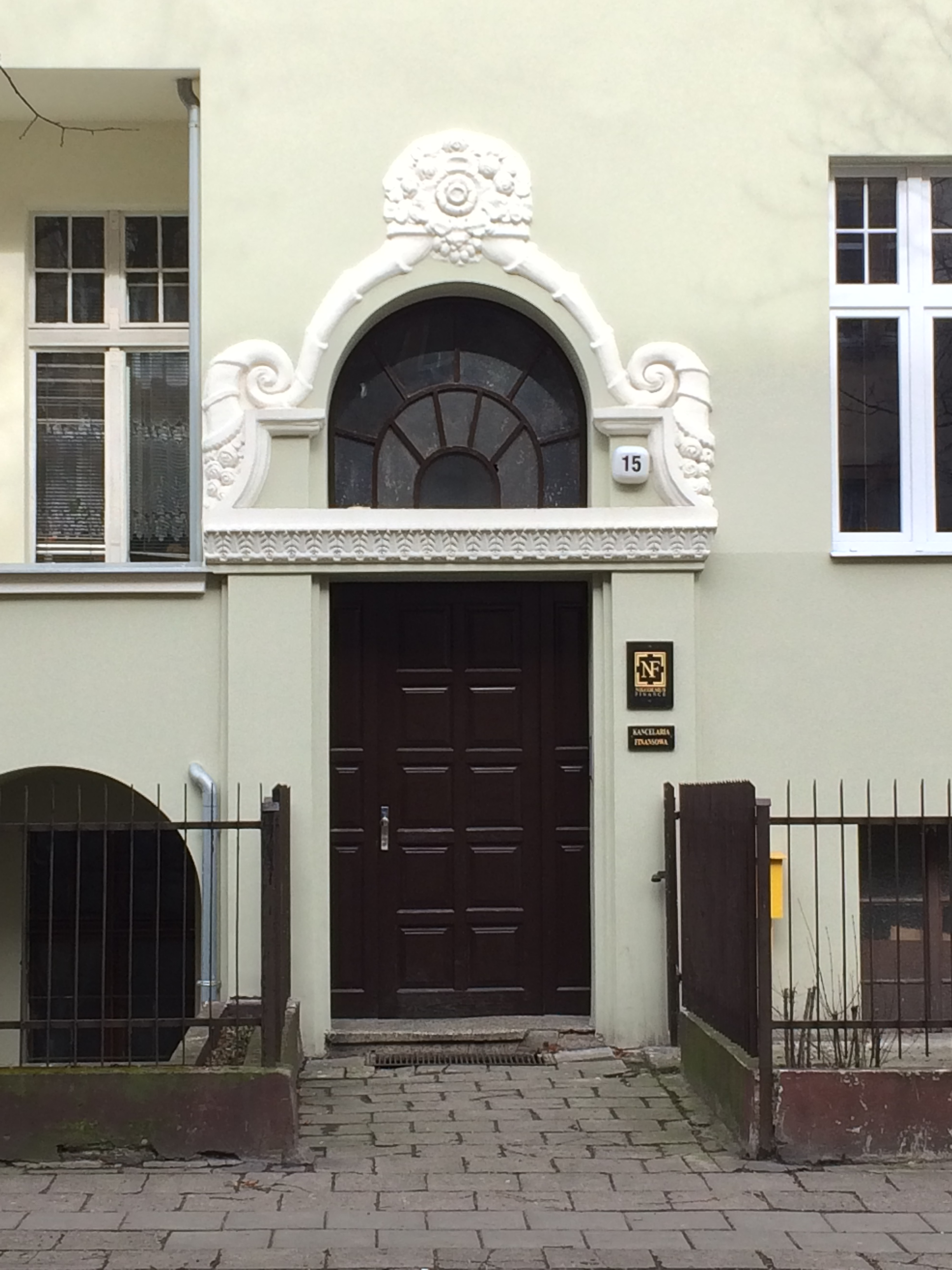
portal on Zamoyskiego street

Tenement corner with Paderewskiego Street 22

1912–1914, by Victor Petrikowski

Early Modernism

Built at the eve of WWI, the first landlord was Otto Möller, an assistant in railway construction business, who dwelt there till the 1930s.

The edifice is one of the first in the street not to display any early modern style, transitioning from Art Nouveau line. The main facade follows without reservation early modernist style. The ensemble has been renovated at the end of 2016.

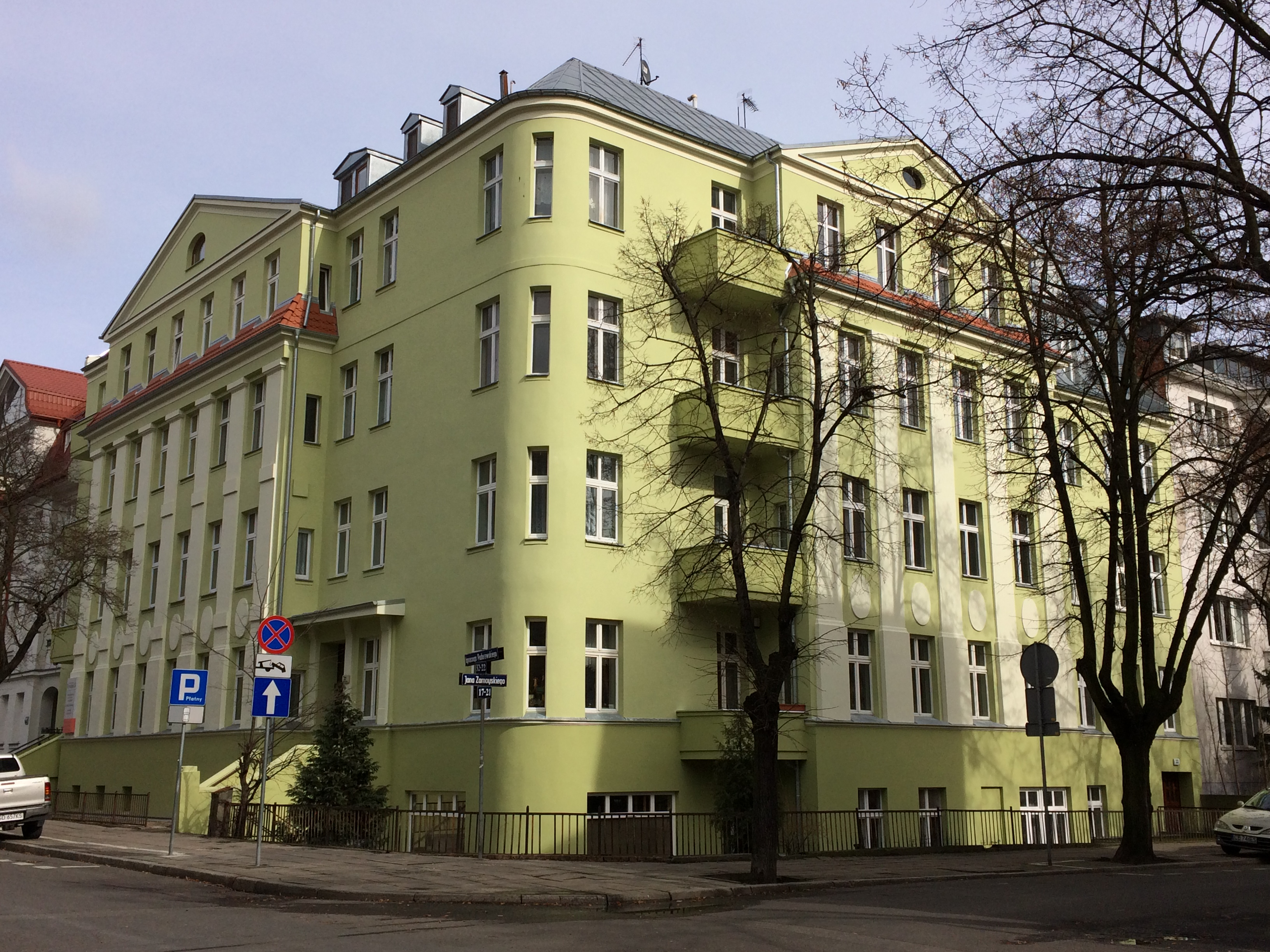
View from street intersection

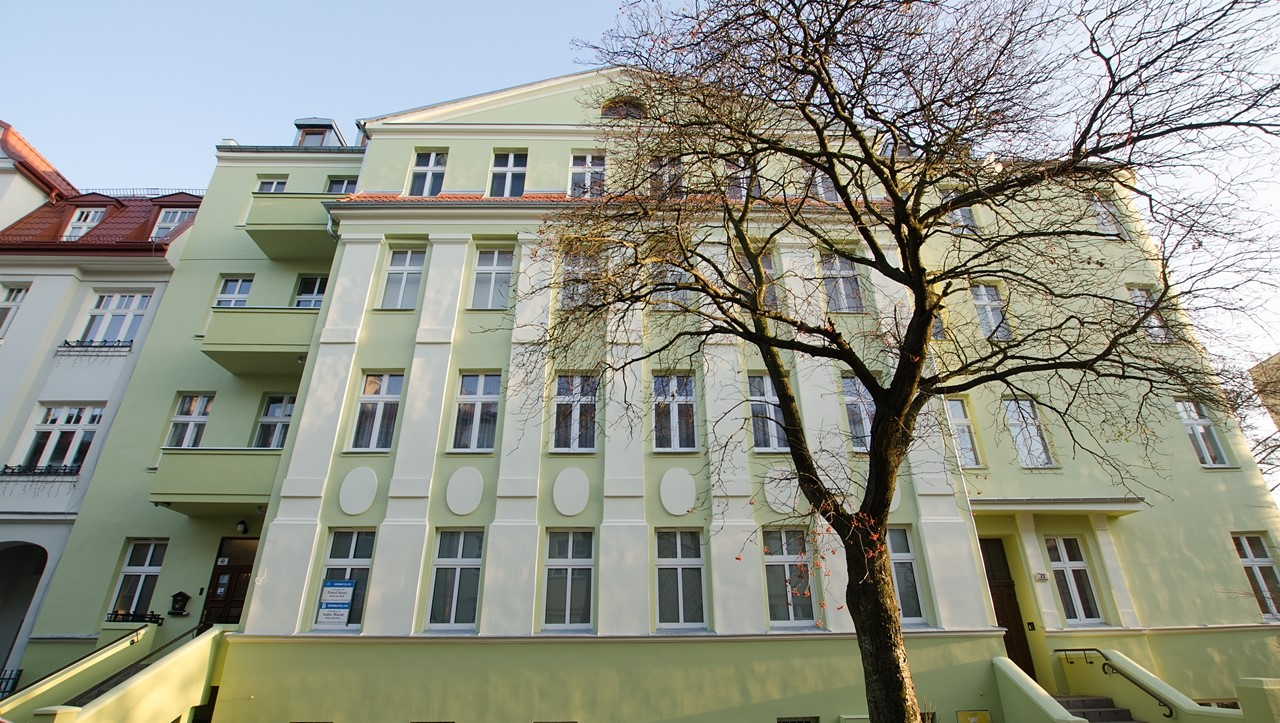
Frontage on Paderewskiego

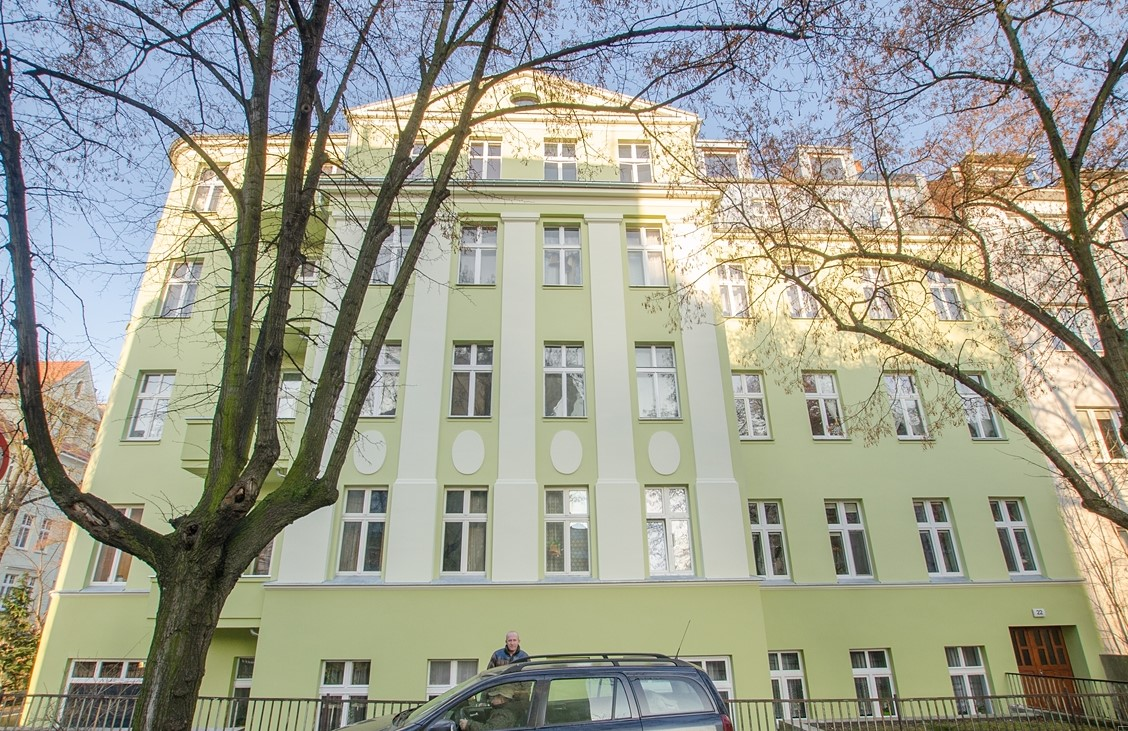
Frontage on Zamoyskiego

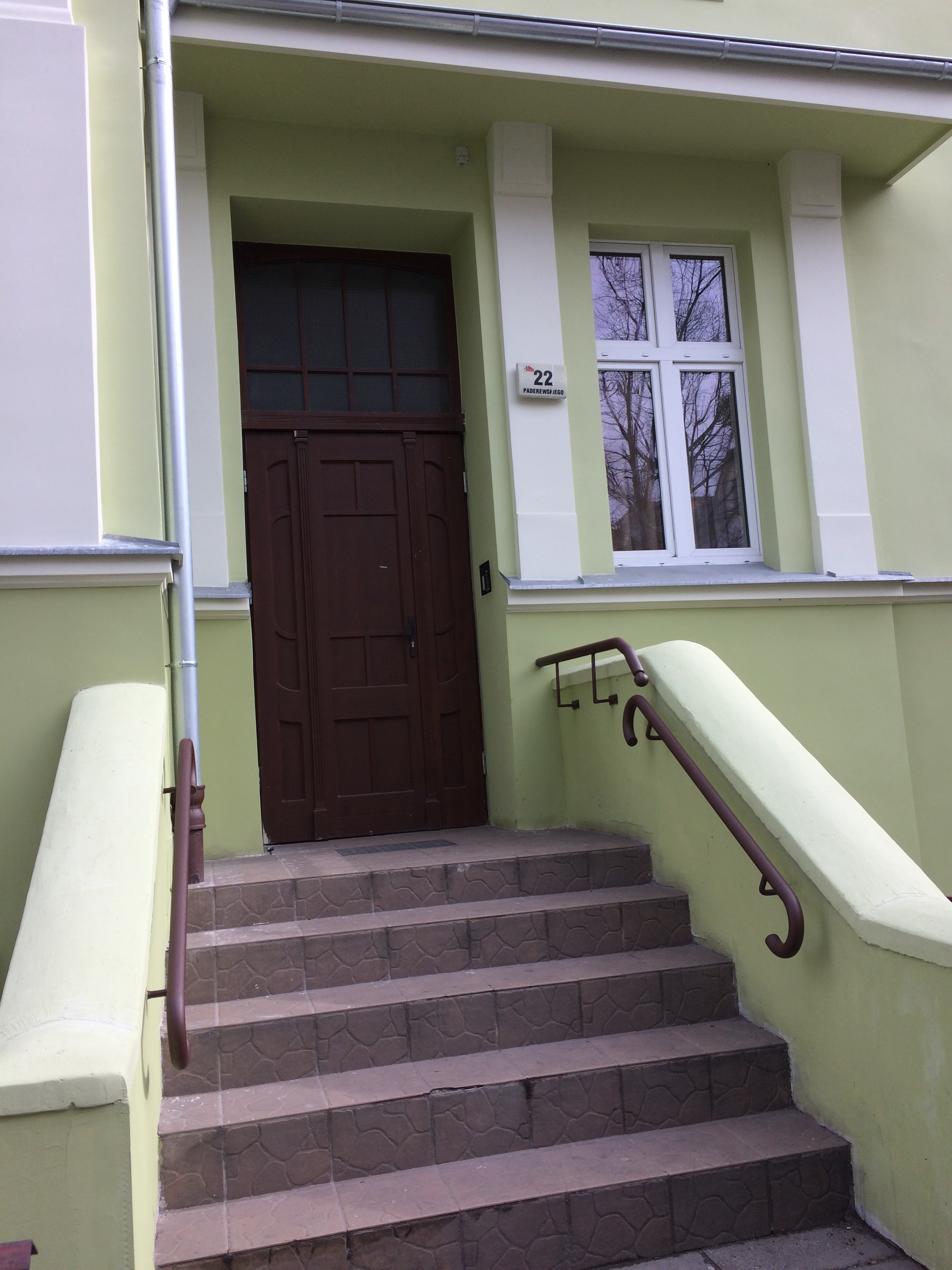
Right side entry gate

Tenement at 17

1936–1937, by Jan Kossowski

Early Modernism

The tenement was designed as a renting building by its commissioner, Bernard Cisewski.

The edifice is characteristic of Jan Kossowski designs, with rich forms, expensive linings and a close attention to details. In doing so, Kossowski was greatly inspired by Le Corbusier's functionalist concepts. Jan Kossowski developed the same design in a larger scale in Poznań at 8 Dąbrowskiego street. The frontage was being renovated in 2018.

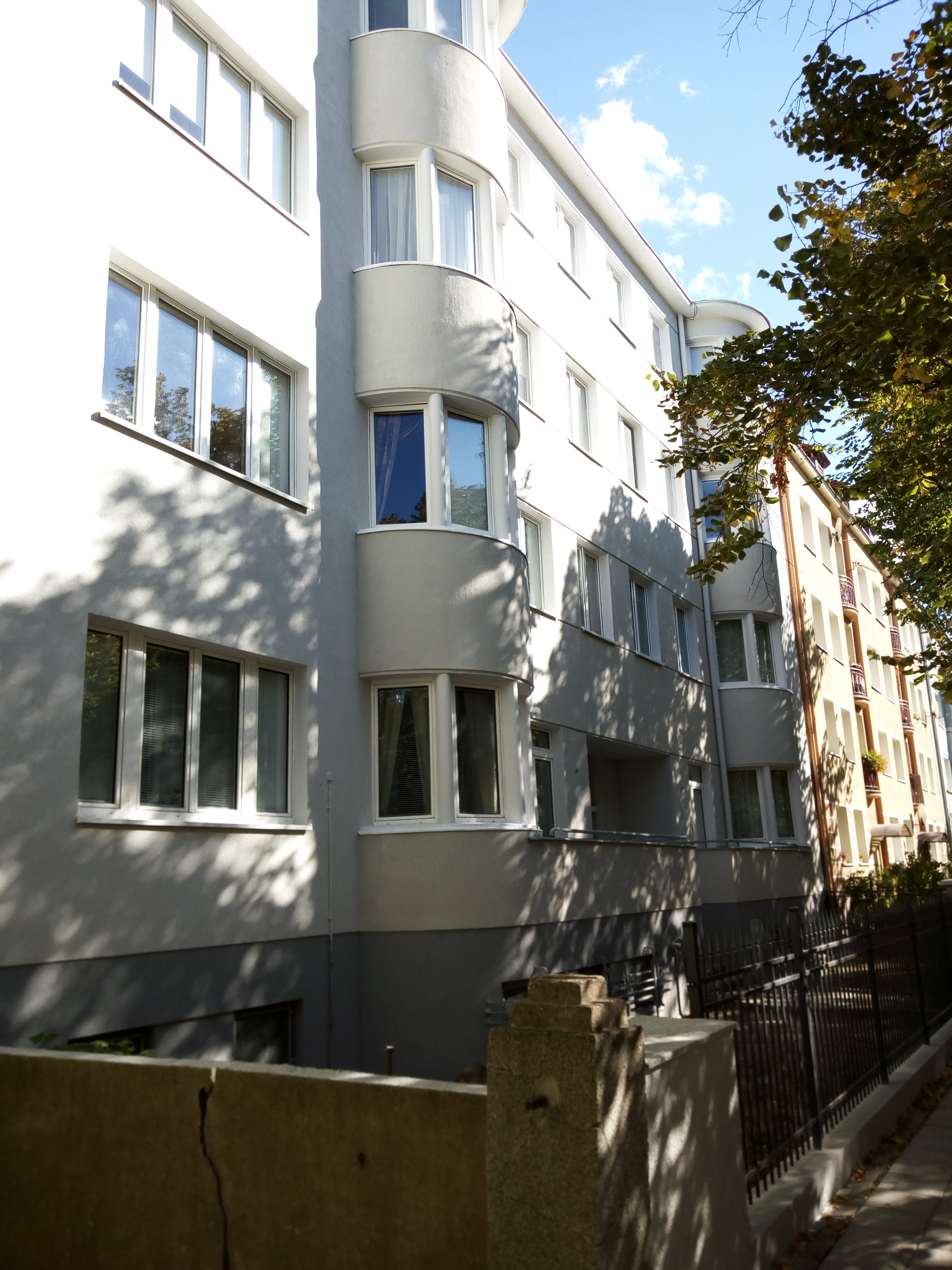
Facade on the street

Tenements at 19 & 21

1930s

Early Modernism

Both tenements are mirroring Kossowski's Nr.17, in the forms as well as in the functionalist concepts.

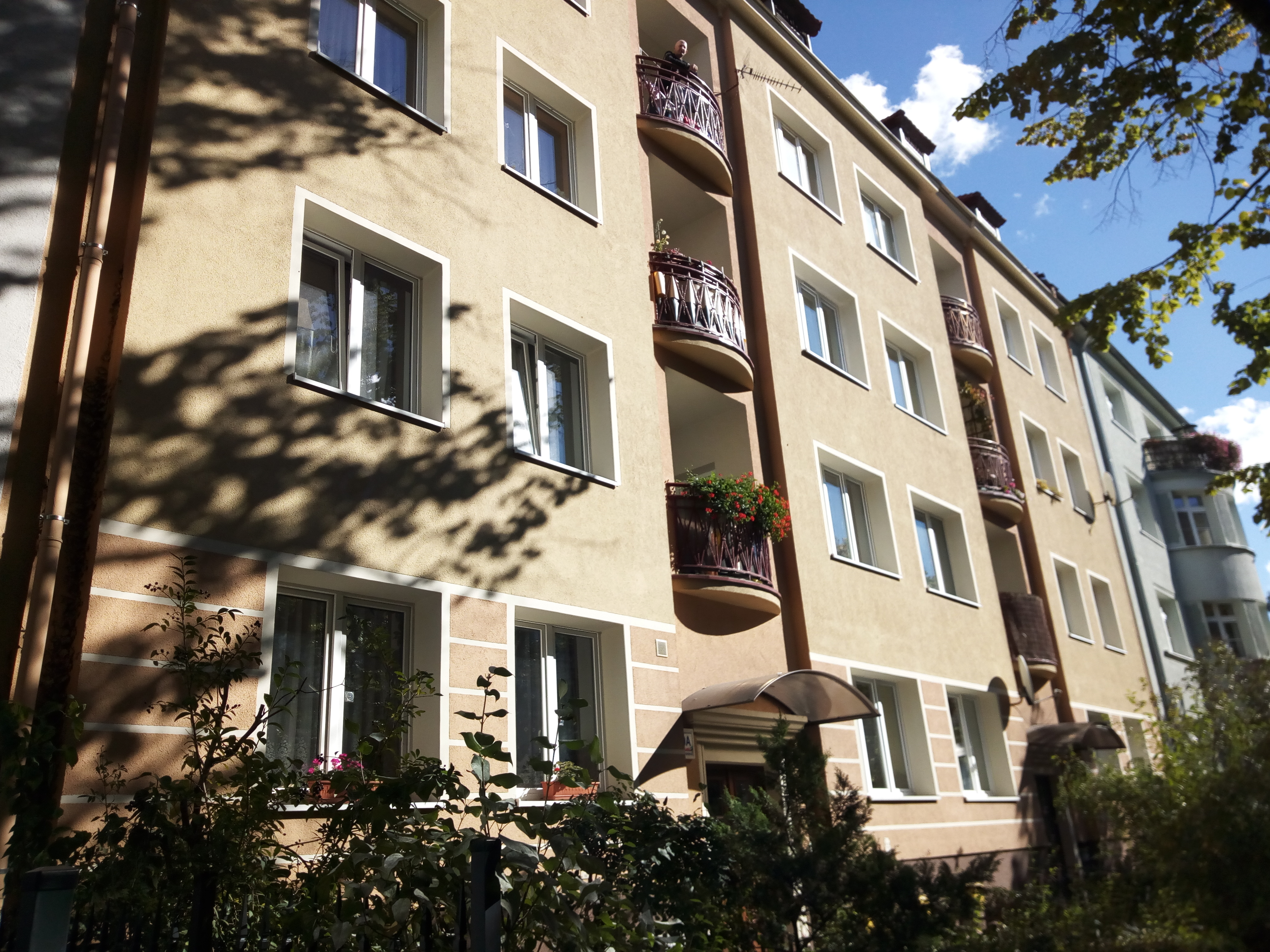
Facade of Nr.19

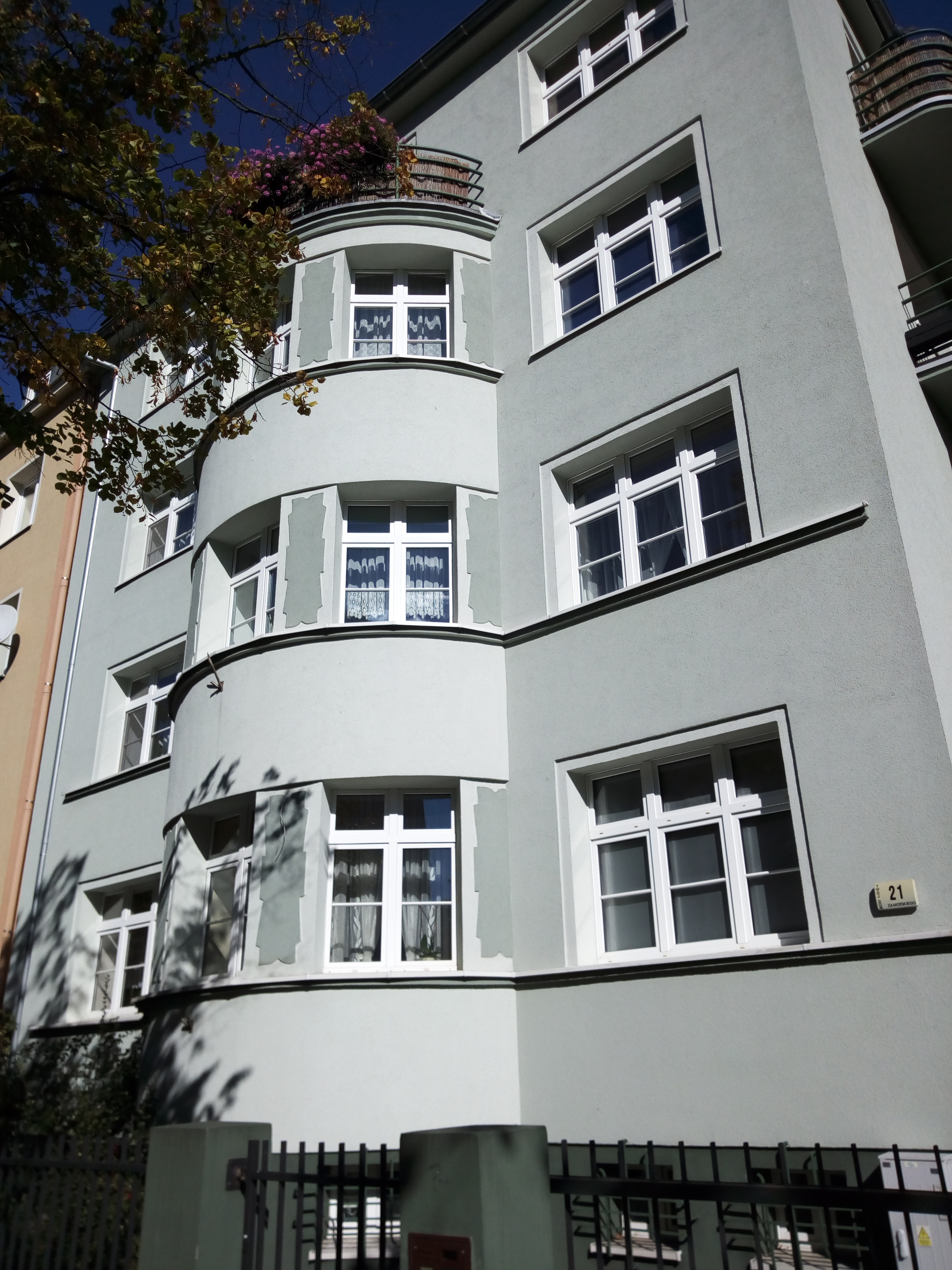
Main frontage at Nr.21

== See also ==
- Bydgoszcz
- Paderewskiego Street in Bydgoszcz
- Gdańska Street, Bydgoszcz
- 20 Stycznia 1920 Street in Bydgoszcz
- Rudolf Kern
- Jan Kossowski

== Bibliography ==
- Bręczewska-Kulesza, Daria (2004). Nowoczesna dzielnica mieszkaniowa z początku XX w. Kronika Bydgoska T26 (in Polish). Bydgoszcz: Towarzystwo Miłosnikow Miasta Bydgoszczy-Bydgoskie Towarzystwo Naukowe. p. 82.
- Wysocka, Agnieszka (2003). Działalność architektoniczna Jana Kossowskiego w Bydgoszczy w latach 1923-1939. Materiały do dziejów kultury i sztuki Bydgoszczy i regionu. Zeszyt 8 (in Polish). Bydgoszcz: Pracownia Dokumentacji i Popularyzacji Zabytków Wojewódzkiego Ośrodka Kultury w Bydgoszczy. pp. 79–98.
