= Kopernika Street, Bydgoszcz =

Street in Poland

Coordinates: 53°07′42″N 18°00′50″E

Kopernika Street
Bydgoszcz
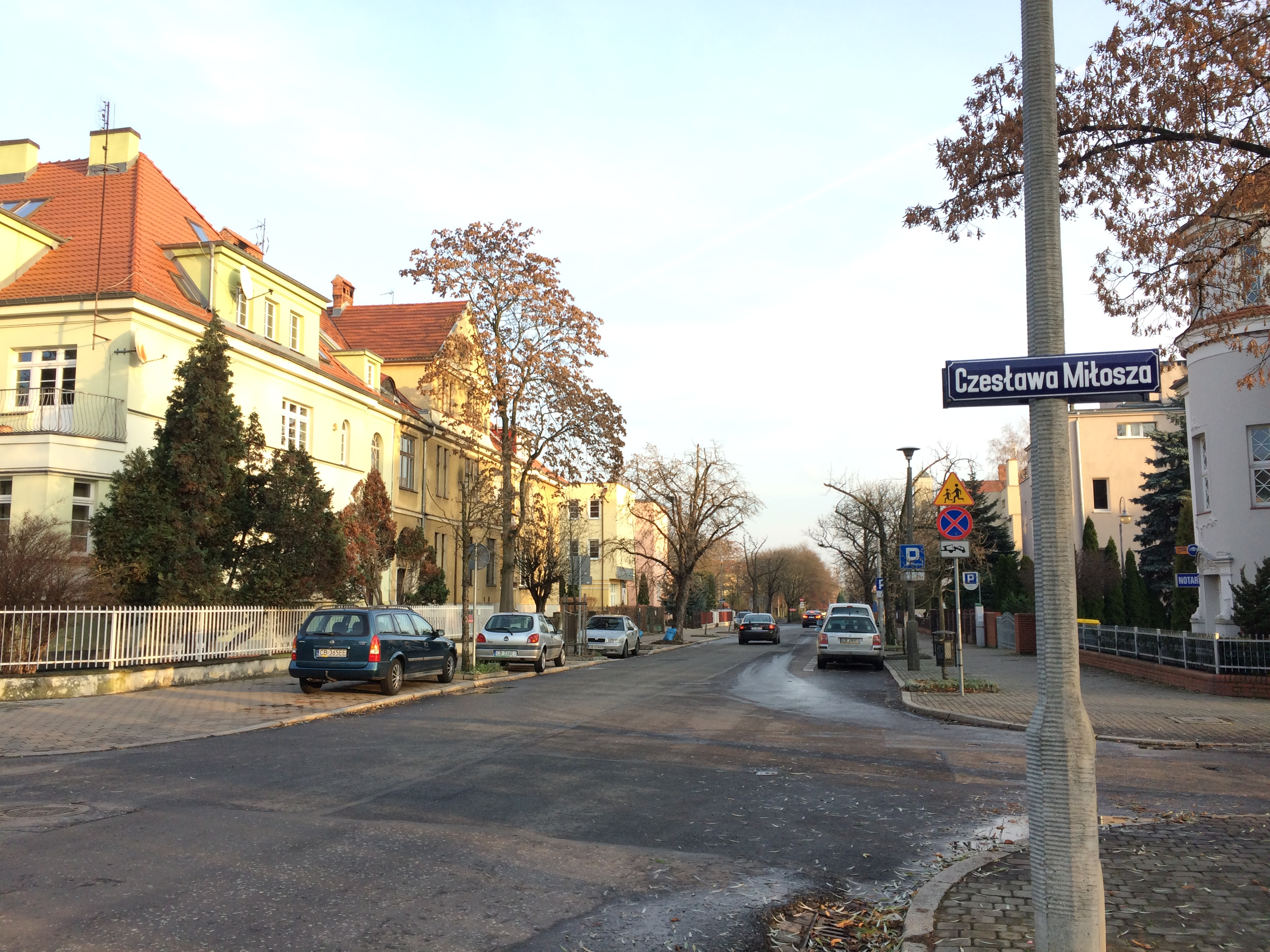
- View of the street

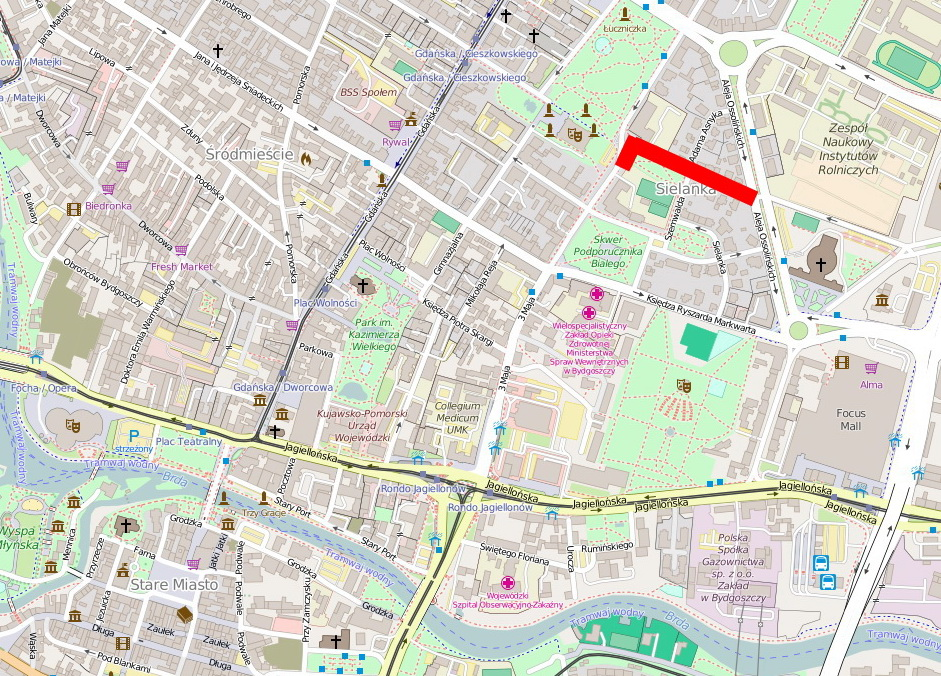
- Location of Kopernika Street in Bydgoszcz
- Native name: Ulica Kopernika w Bydgoszczy (Polish)
- Former names: Eigenheimm Straße A, Hindenburg straße, Bismarck Straße
- Part of: Downtown Bydgoszcz
- Namesake: Nicolaus Copernicus
- Owner: City of Bydgoszcz
- Length: 270 m (890 ft)
- Location: Bydgoszcz, Poland

Kopernika street is located in central Bydgoszcz. Several buildings on Kopernika Street are registered on the Kuyavian-Pomeranian Voivodeship Heritage List. The street is named for Nicolaus Copernicus (1473 – 1543).

== Location ==
Kopernika Street is located in the eastern part of central Bydgoszcz. The street runs between Ossoliński Alley and Staszica and Paderewskiego Streets. It is close to the precinct of the Pomeranian Philharmonic orchestra.

== Naming ==
The name of the street has changed over time:

- Eigenheimm Straße A and then Hindenburg straße (1914 – 1920);
- Ulica Kopernika (1920 – 1939);
- Bismarck Straße (1939 – 1945) after Otto von Bismarck;
- Ulica Kopernika (1945 onwards).

== History ==
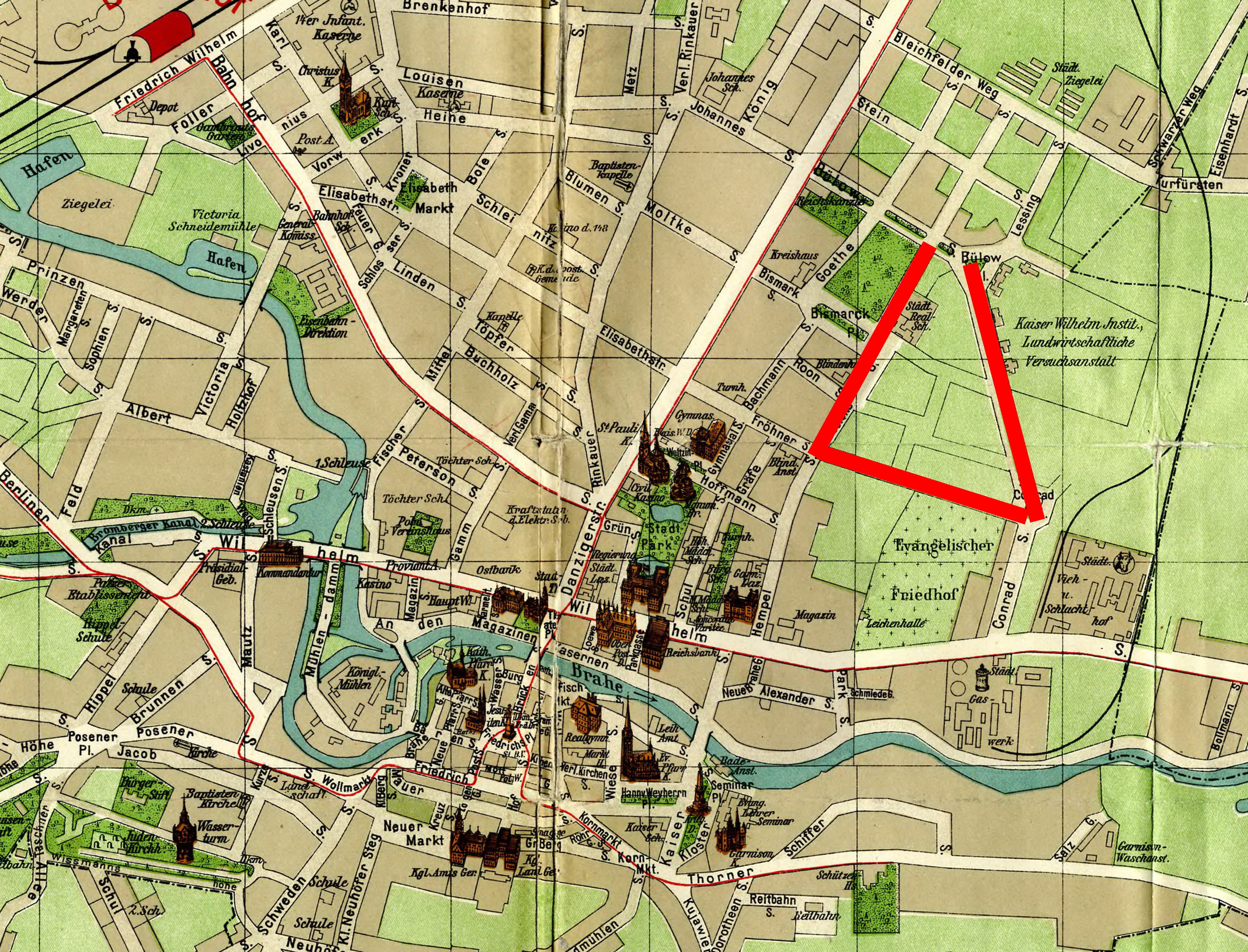
Map of Sielanka, 1908

In the early 20th century, Bydgoszcz was called "Bromberg". A large distinct area developed east of the town centre. This area was delineated by Ossoliński Alley, Adam Mickiewicz Alley and Markwarta, Paderewskiego and Staszica streets. The area lay north of a Christian cemetery which became Ludowy Park, on Jagiellońska street.

In 1906, the Emperor Wilhelm Royal Institute of Agriculture, (Kaiser Wilhelm's Institut für Landwirtschaft zu Bromberg) was constructed to the east of the area. At the same time, between 1905 and 1907, the Royal School of Bromberg (Stadt Real Schule) was constructed to the west of the area. This became the Copernicanum building. Between 1903 and 1907, most of the tenements on Adam Mickiewicz Alley were completed. This formed the north boundary of the area. Between 1910 and 1912, the People's School for Boys (Bürgerschule) was formed on the western boundary. It became High School Nr.6.

The resulting triangular area was then further developed as the Sielanka (English: Idyll). In December 1912, Josef Stübben (1845 – 1936) made a sketch for the area. The project was led by Heinrich Metzger, and urban engineer. The surveyor was Bernhard Hirsch.

In the draft, the area was divided into seven irregularly shaped parts. Five of the parts were devoted to the construction of small houses. These parts were near what became Asnyka Street and the southern part of Paderewskiego Street.

The Copernicanum building was built on Staszica Street but the south western tip of the area near Markwarta street remained available for development. At the time, this land was the property of the Province of Posen. It later became a square named after Leszek the White (1124 – 1227), a Polish prince.

In the 1920s, fifty plots for building were defined. Their land areas varied from 600 to 1400 m^{2}. The first house to be built in Sielanka became 5 Kopernika Street. During World War I, construction ceased.

In 1925, the town allowed the resumption of construction and encouraged the project with generous loans and appropriate regulations. Local workers were employed. Between 1914 and 1945, the town issued forty-eight building permits. Thirty-six of these were issued between 1927 and 1933.

== Places and buildings ==
=== Copernicanum building ===
The Copernicanum building appears on the Kuyavian-Pomeranian Voivodeship Heritage List, Nr.601363, Reg.A/784 (5 May 1992) It was constructed between 1903 and 1906 by Carl Zaar and Rudolf Vahl. The building is designed in the Art Nouveau (Secession) style.

The Copernicanum building has had several occupants and owners. These include a Prussian realschule; a Copernicus High School for mathematics and natural sciences (1923); and a military hospital during the German occupation (1939 – 1945). Since 2005, the owner has been the Kazimierz Wielki University (after Casimir III the Great (1330 – 1370)).

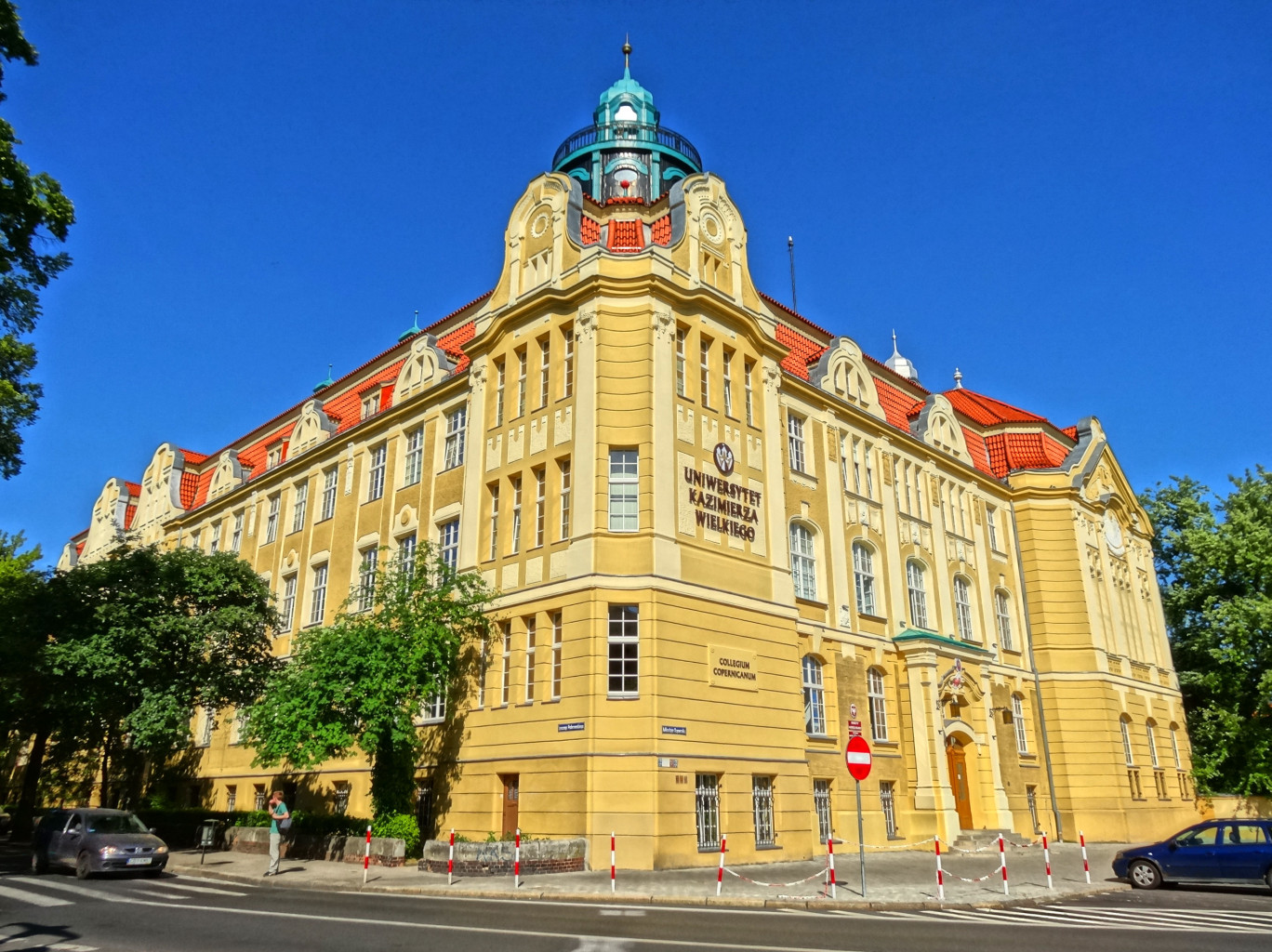
Copernicus building from Kopernika street

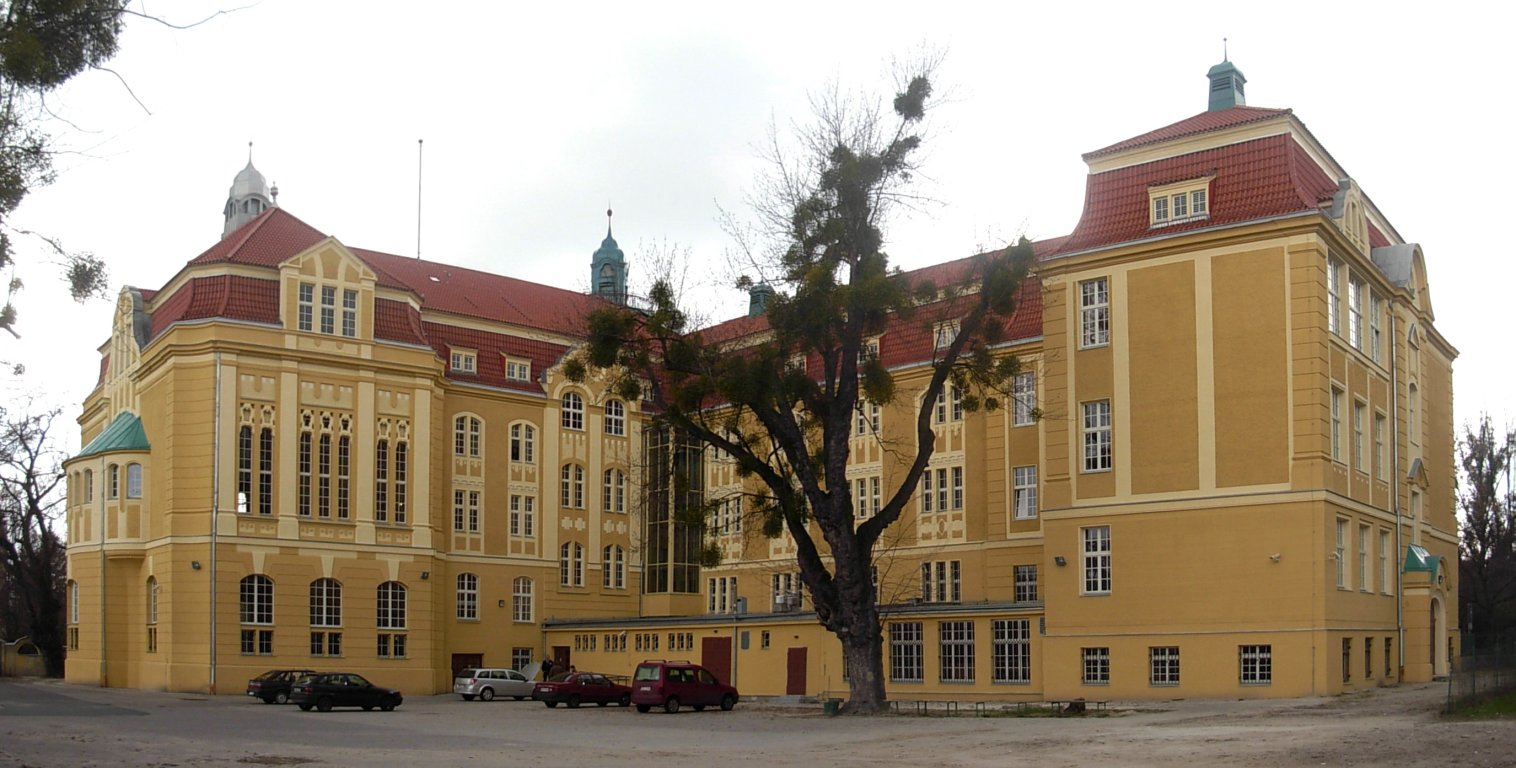
Copernicus building back yard

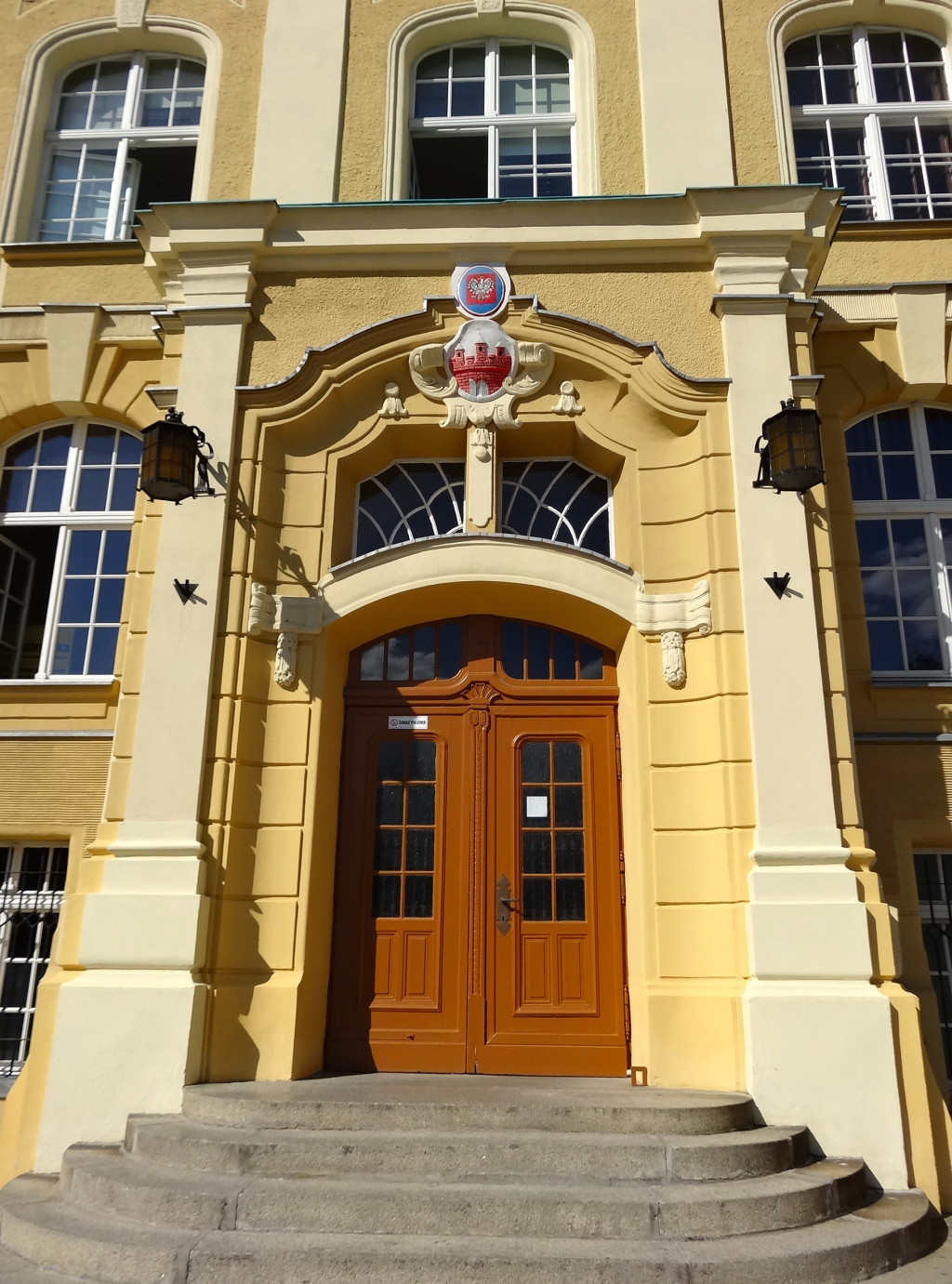
Copernicus building main entrance

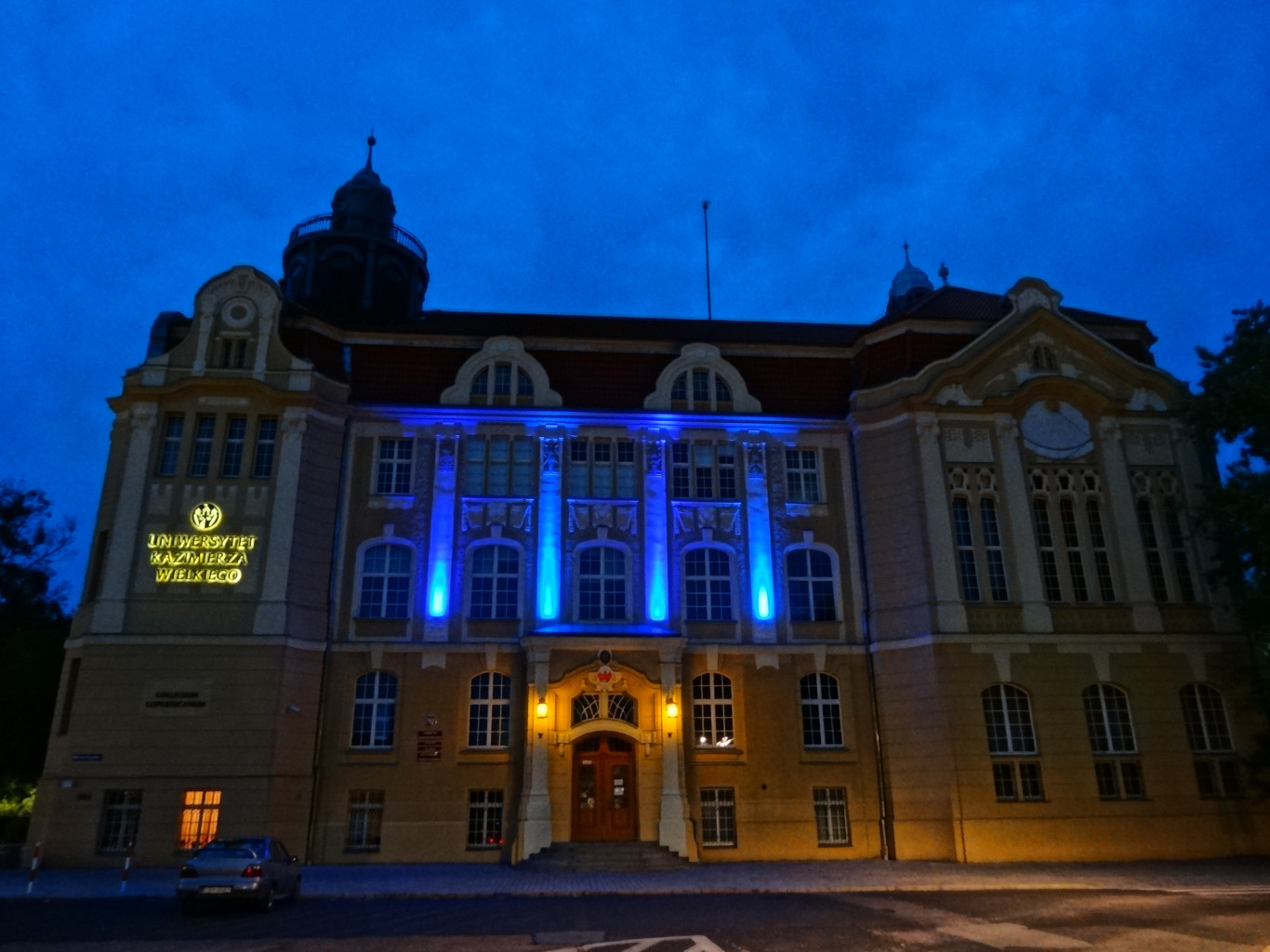
Copernicus building by night

=== Kopernika Square ===
Kopernika Square is a green area landscaped in 1973. Its statuary includes a metal sculpture of a female figure by Maria Chudoba-Wiśniewska, a mid-20th century sculptor of Poznań. The sculpture weighs 864 kg and is 4,57m tall. The sculpture was erected during the National Open Air Sculpture Festival (Ogólnopolski Plener Rzeźbiarski) which took place from August to September 1973. Round shaped stones can be found on the grass, positioned on ellipse rings surrounding the statue: they represent the planets of the Solar System in orbit, including the Sun and the Moon.

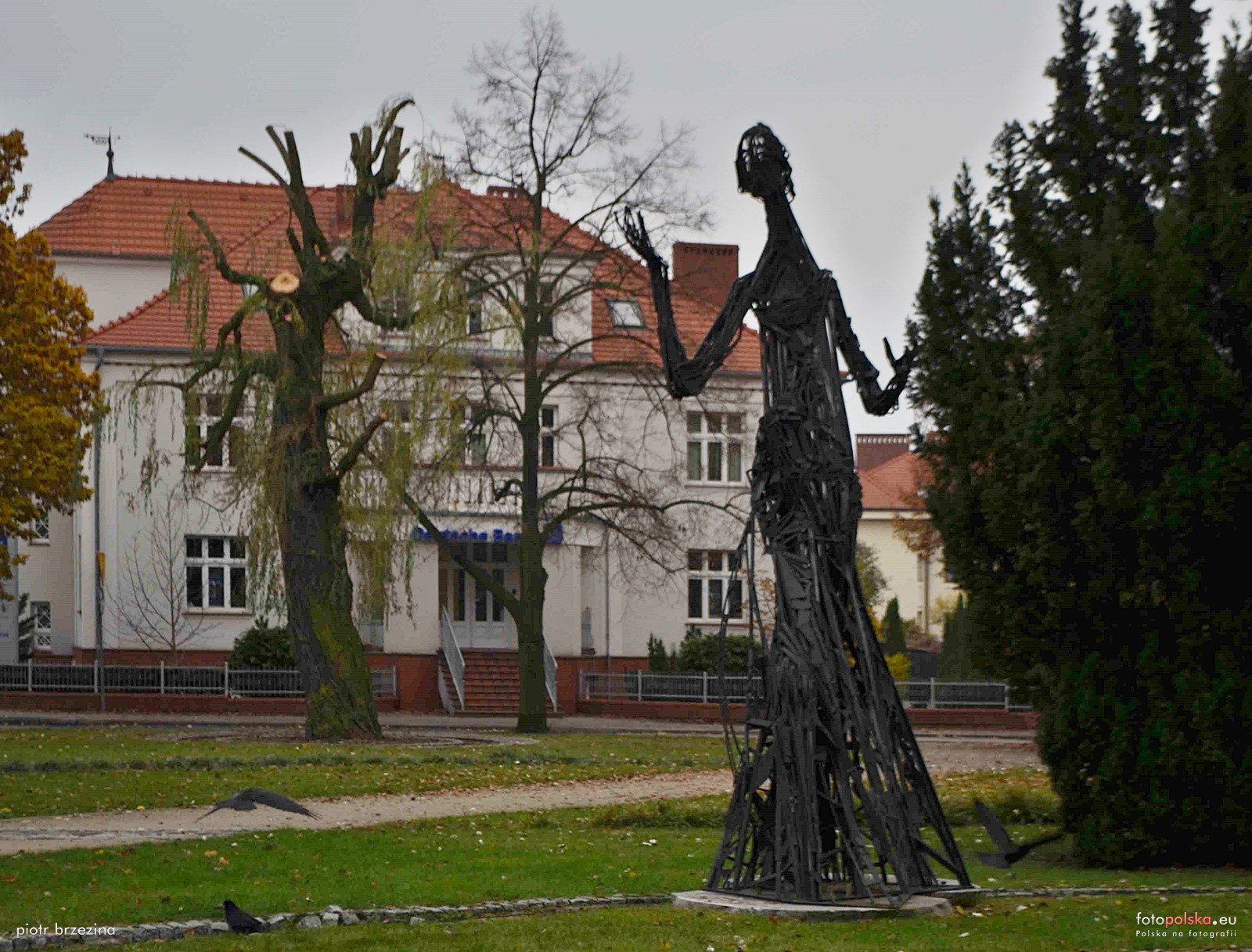
Statue in Kopernika Square

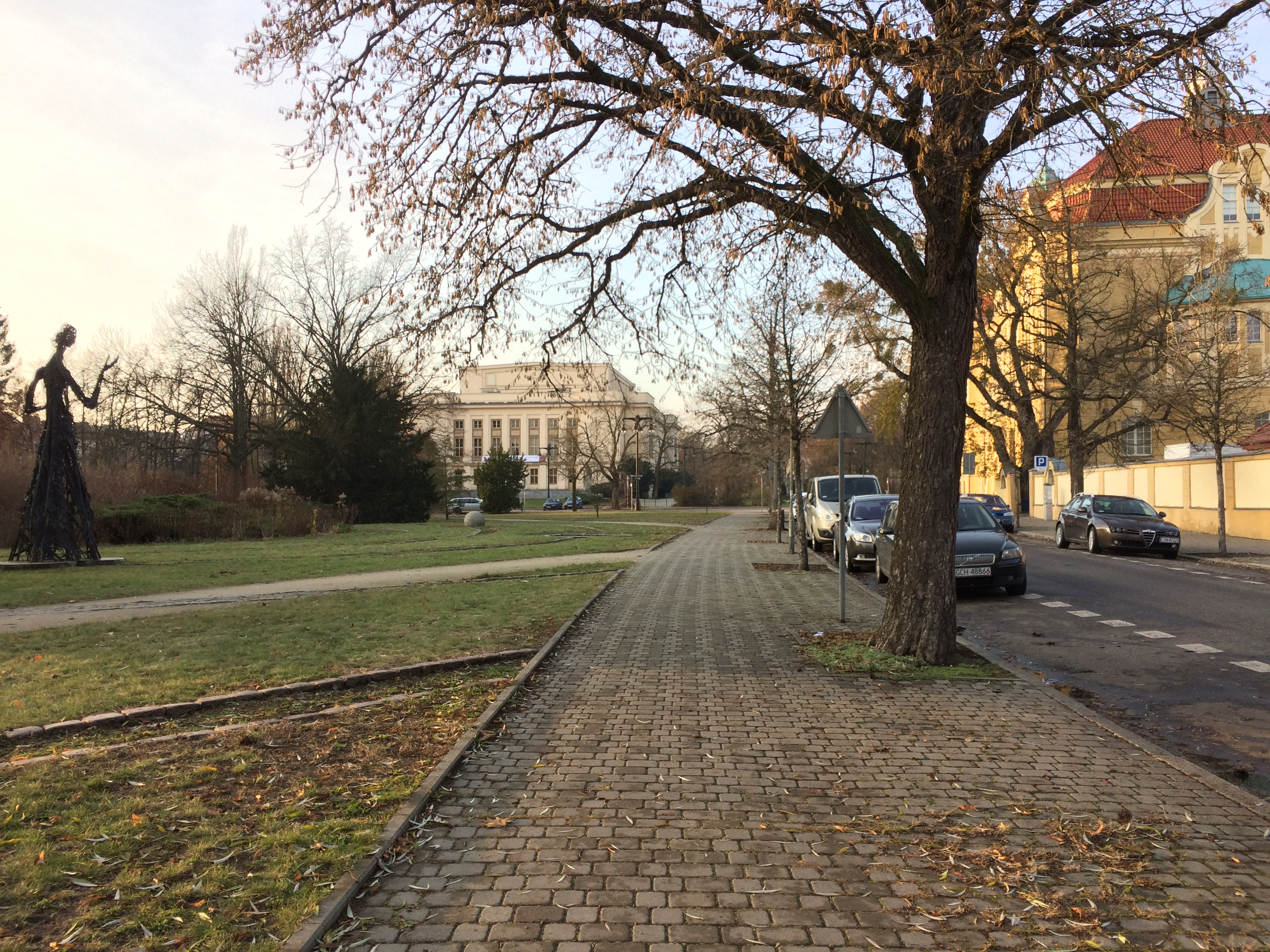
Ellipse rings with round stones on Kopernika Square

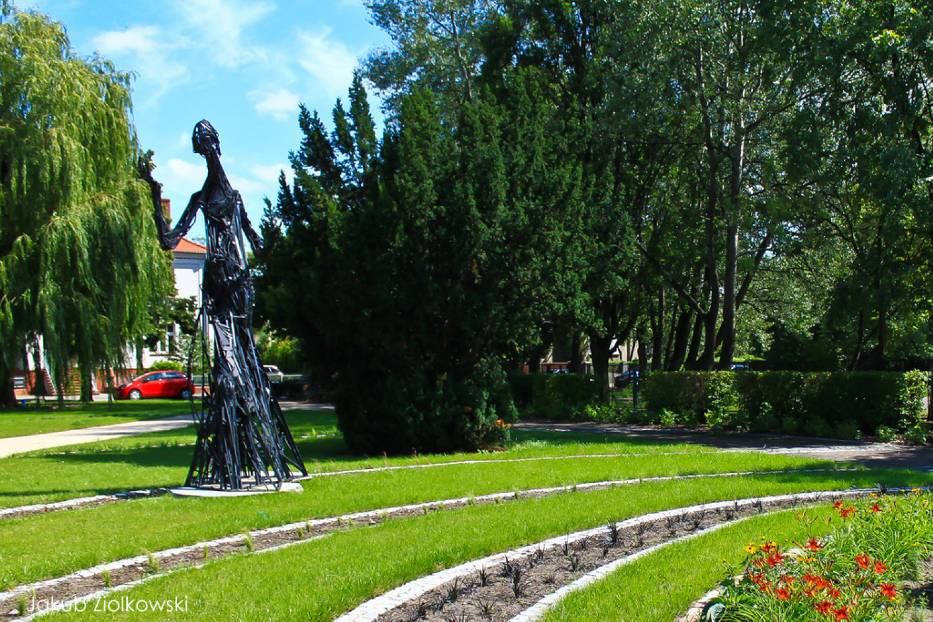
Kopernika Square in summer

=== House at 1 Asnyka street, corner with Kopernika street ===
In 1932, the house on the corner of Asnyka Street and Kopernika Street was designed, built and occupied by the architect Bogdan Raczkowski (1888 – 1939) in 1932. It is designed in the Functionalist style. In 1921, Rackowski became a member of the Bydgoszcz municipal council. In December 1922, he became a member of the City Development Committee. In 1934, Raczkowski retired. His wife Maria, his daughter Danuta and he were arrested and shot on 4 October 1939 in the forest north of Bydgoszcz (Polish: Las Gdański). His brother Tadeusz was murdered later the same month in the Valley of Death.

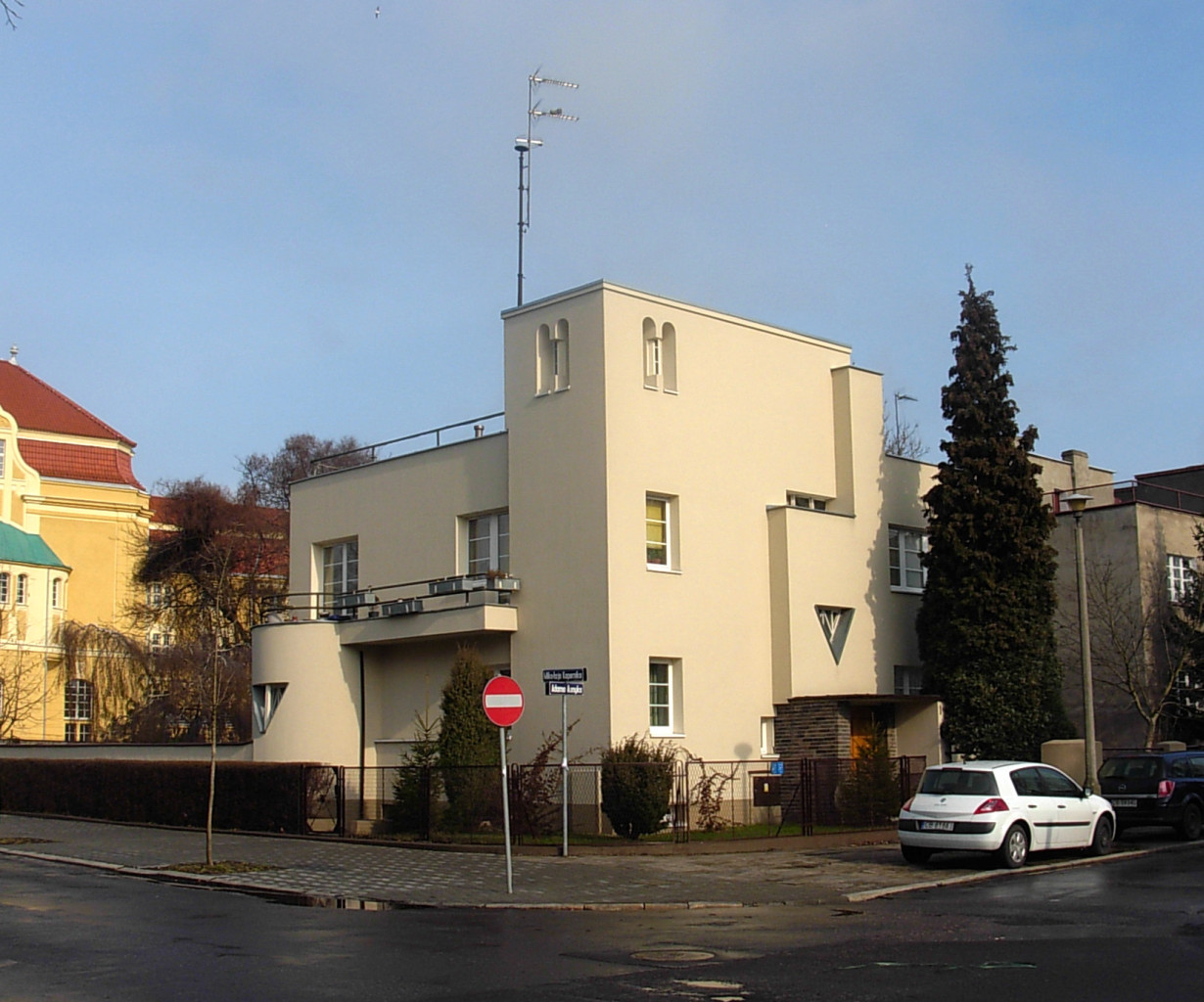
1 Asnyka Street, Kopernika building to the left

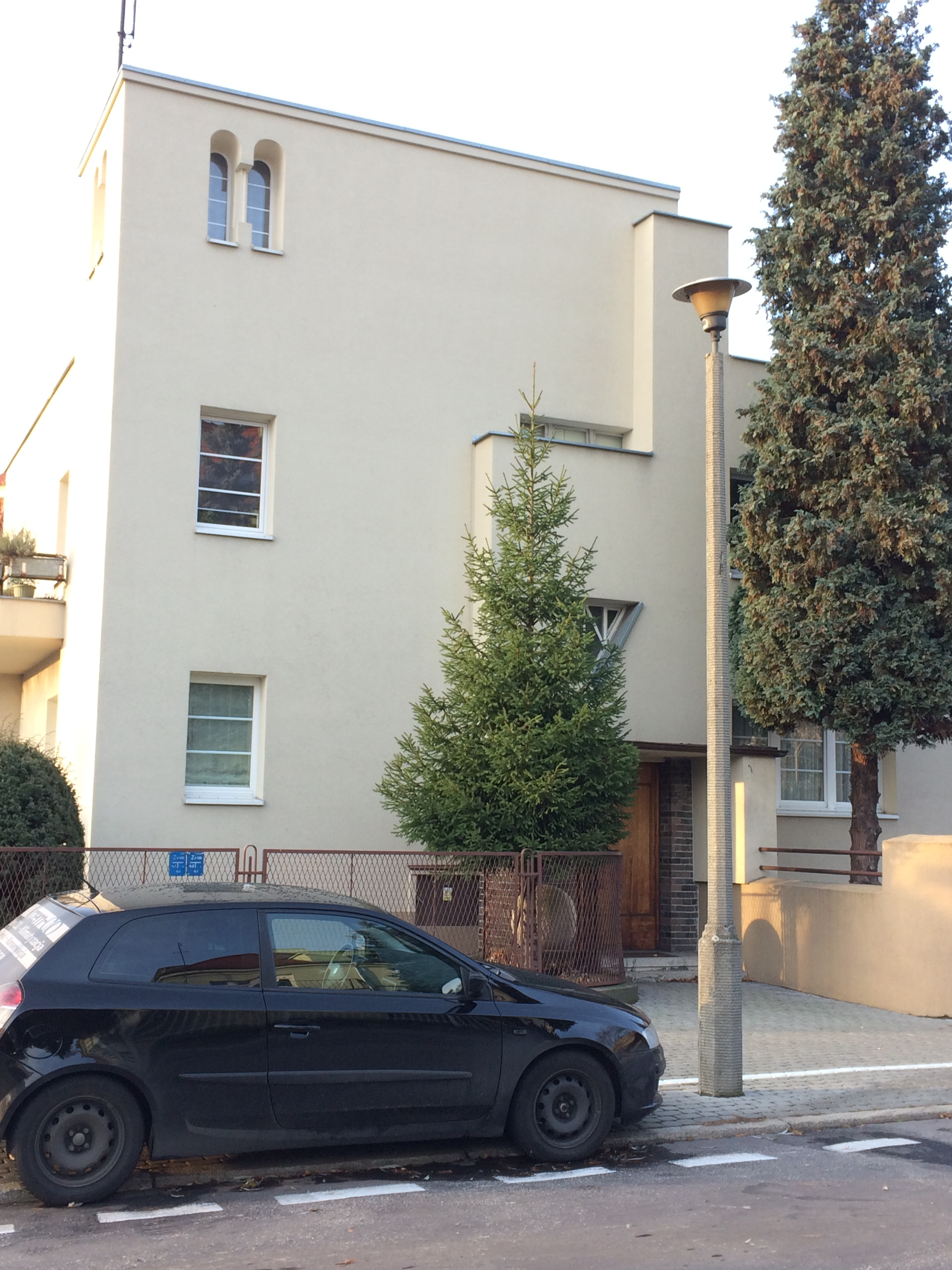
1 Asnyka Street, facade

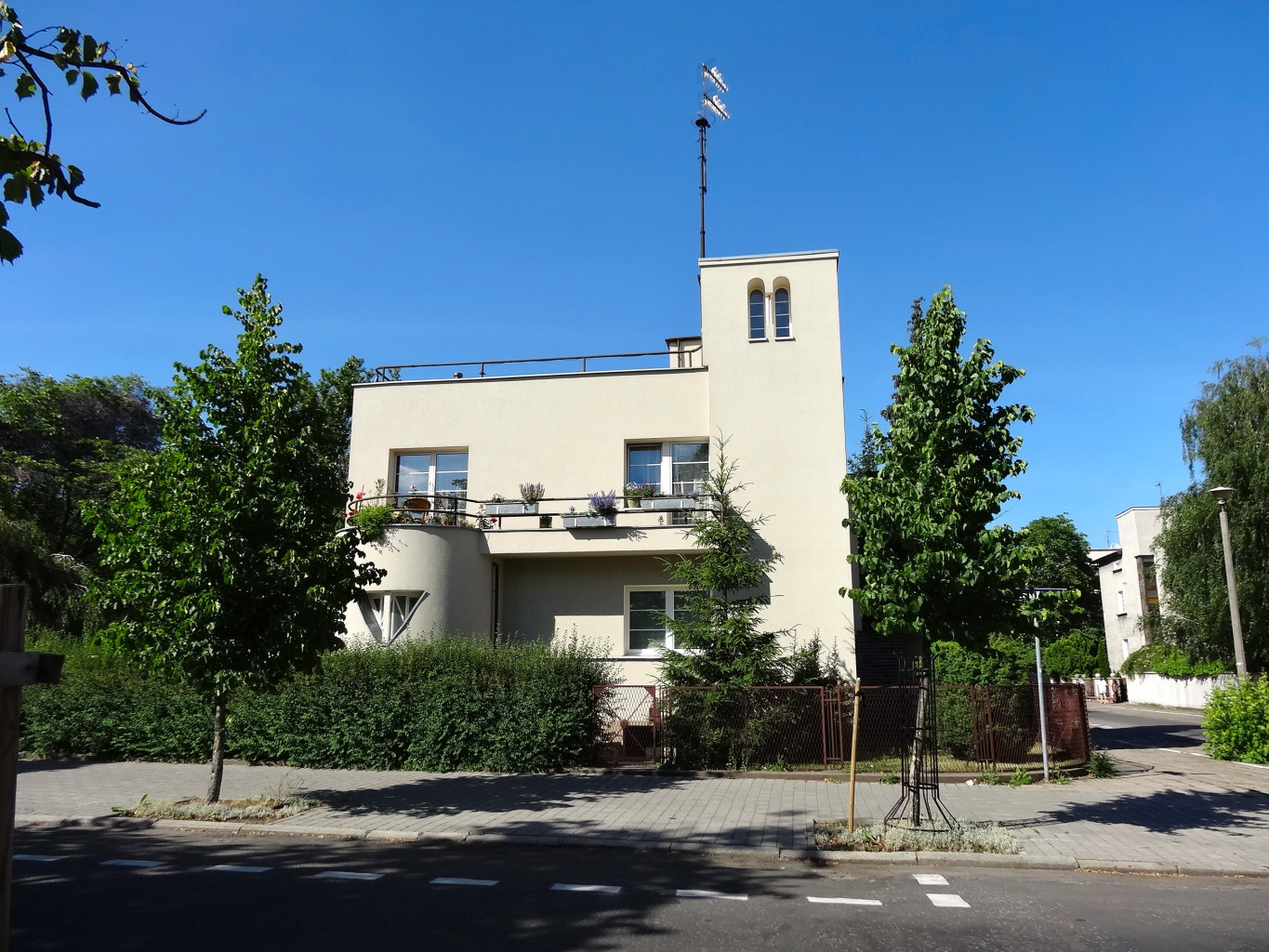
Elevation from Kopernika Street

=== House at 3 Kopernika street ===
3 Kopernika Street on the corner with Asnyka Street was constructed between 1933 and 1935. It was designed by Paweł Wawrzon in the Functionalist style. The large villa has a massive avant-corps which carries a balcony. On both street elevations there are ample shed dormers overhanging the gable. The entrance has a delicate transom light, topped by an oeil-de-boeuf and a springline window.

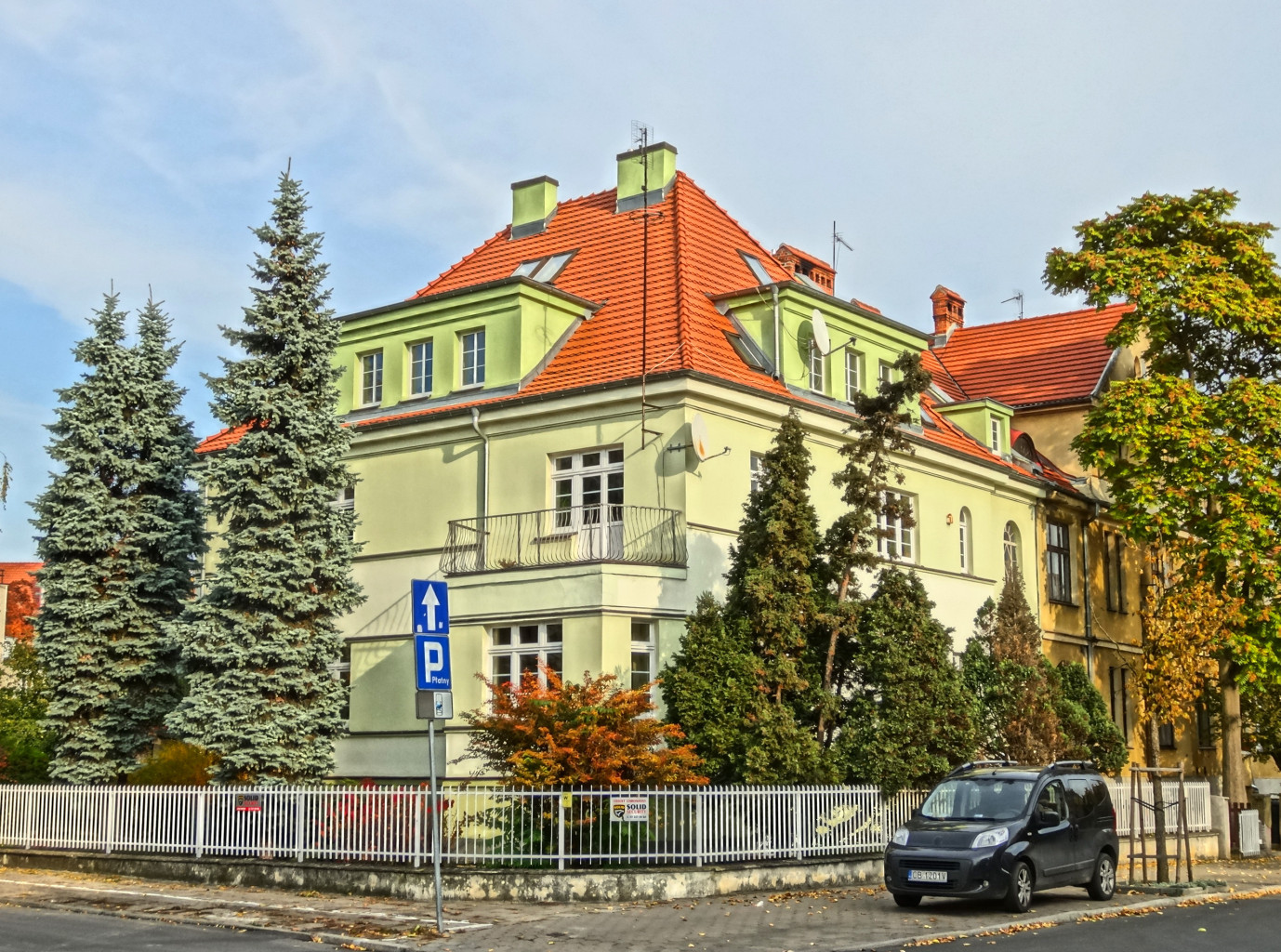
3 Kopernika Street

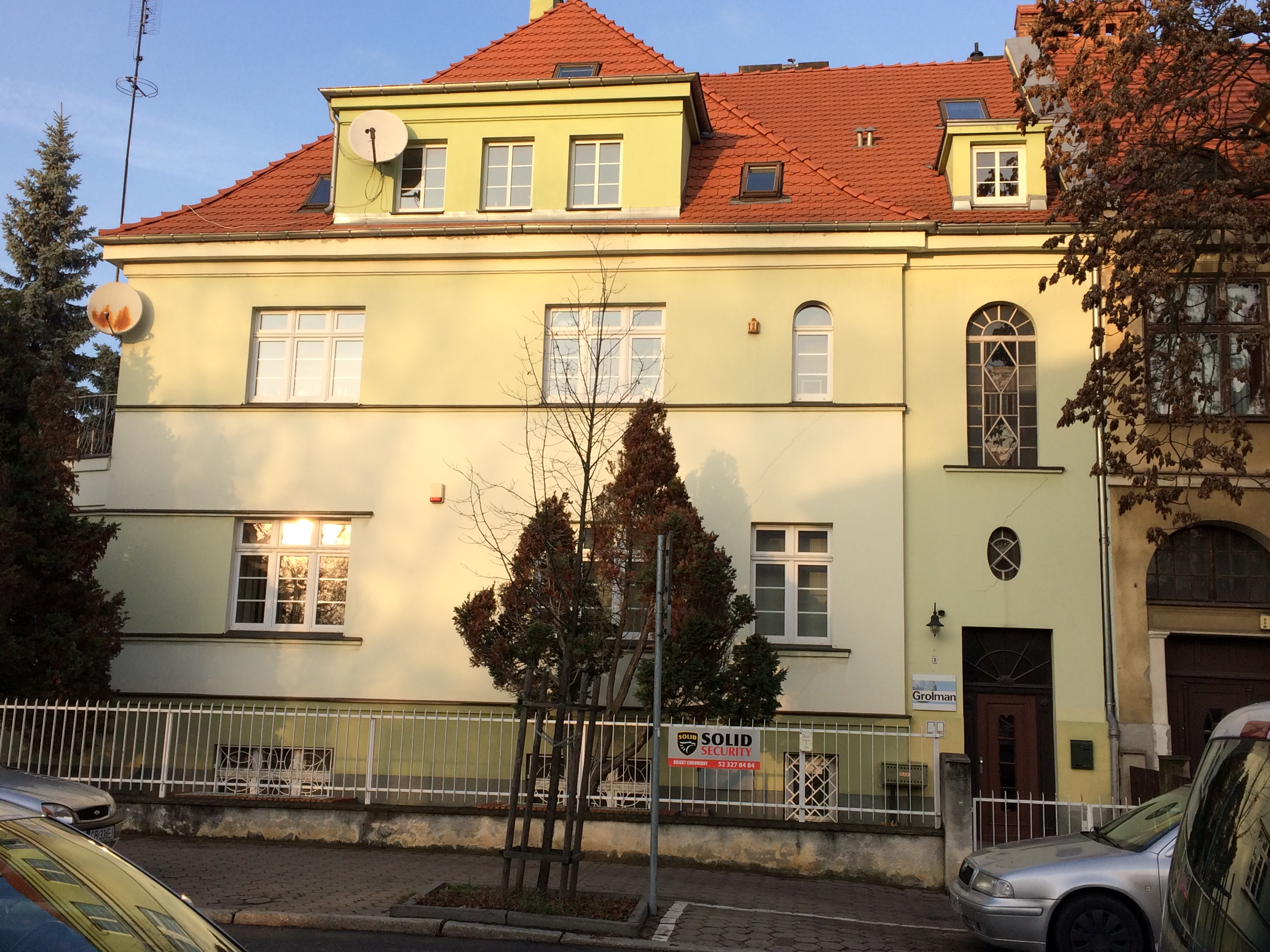
3 Kopernika Street, façade

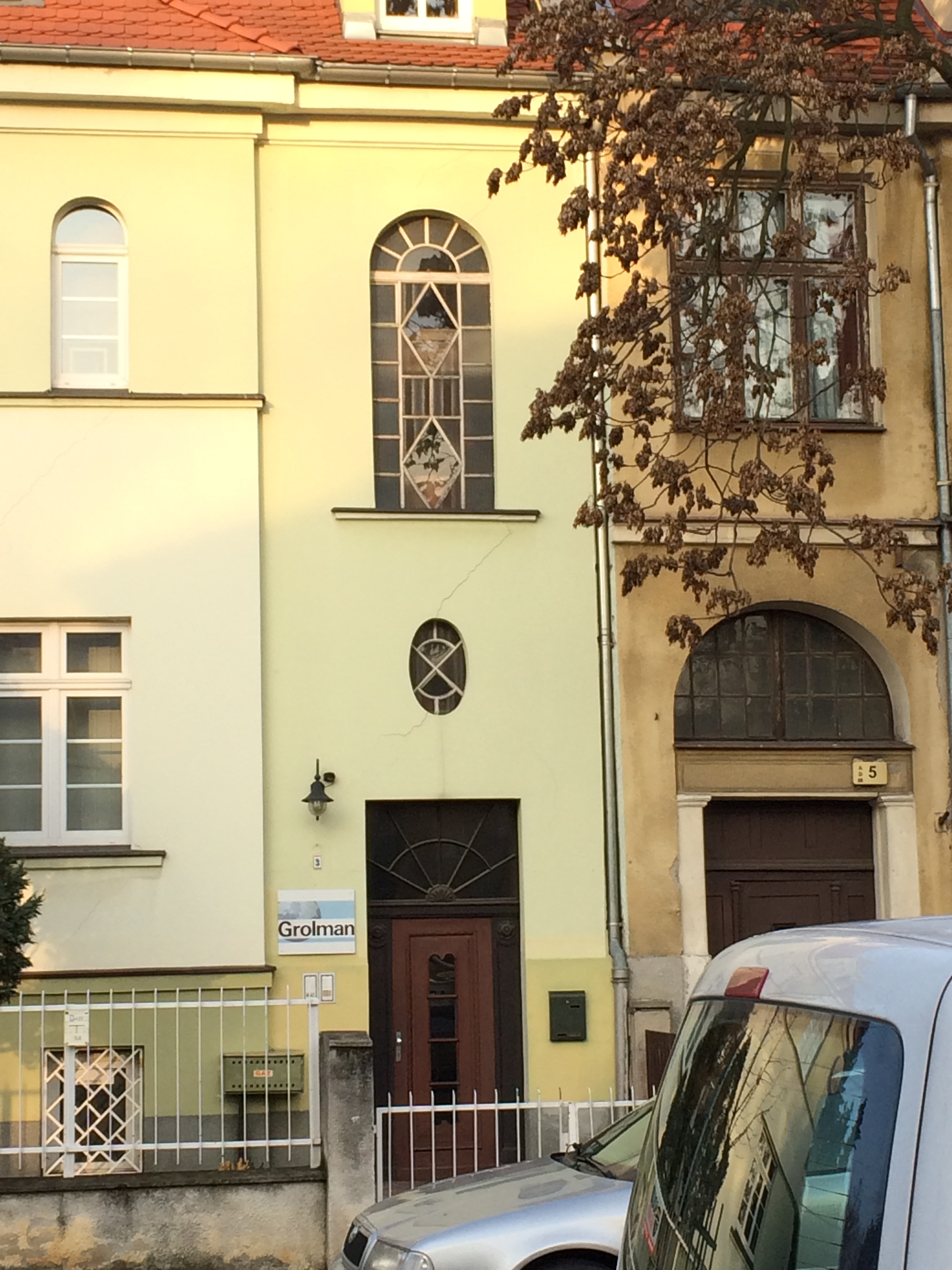
3 Kopernika Street, entrance

=== Building at 5 – 7 Kopernika street ===
The large house at 5 – 7 Kopernika Street was built between 1914 and 1916 by Rudolf Kern. It was designed in the early modernist style. The house was built for the Secretary of the Bydgoszcz Regency, Ernest Werner. Later, another floor was added. The house had a family area on the ground floor with five bedrooms above and servants' quarters in the basement.

The house has two avant-corps. One is on the main elevation topped by a balcony. The other one is on the side. It is curved with thin and tall openings. At the gable, a large dormer is situated between two kernel and eyelid dormers. The entrance has a semi-circular transom light, and two pilasters, one on either side.

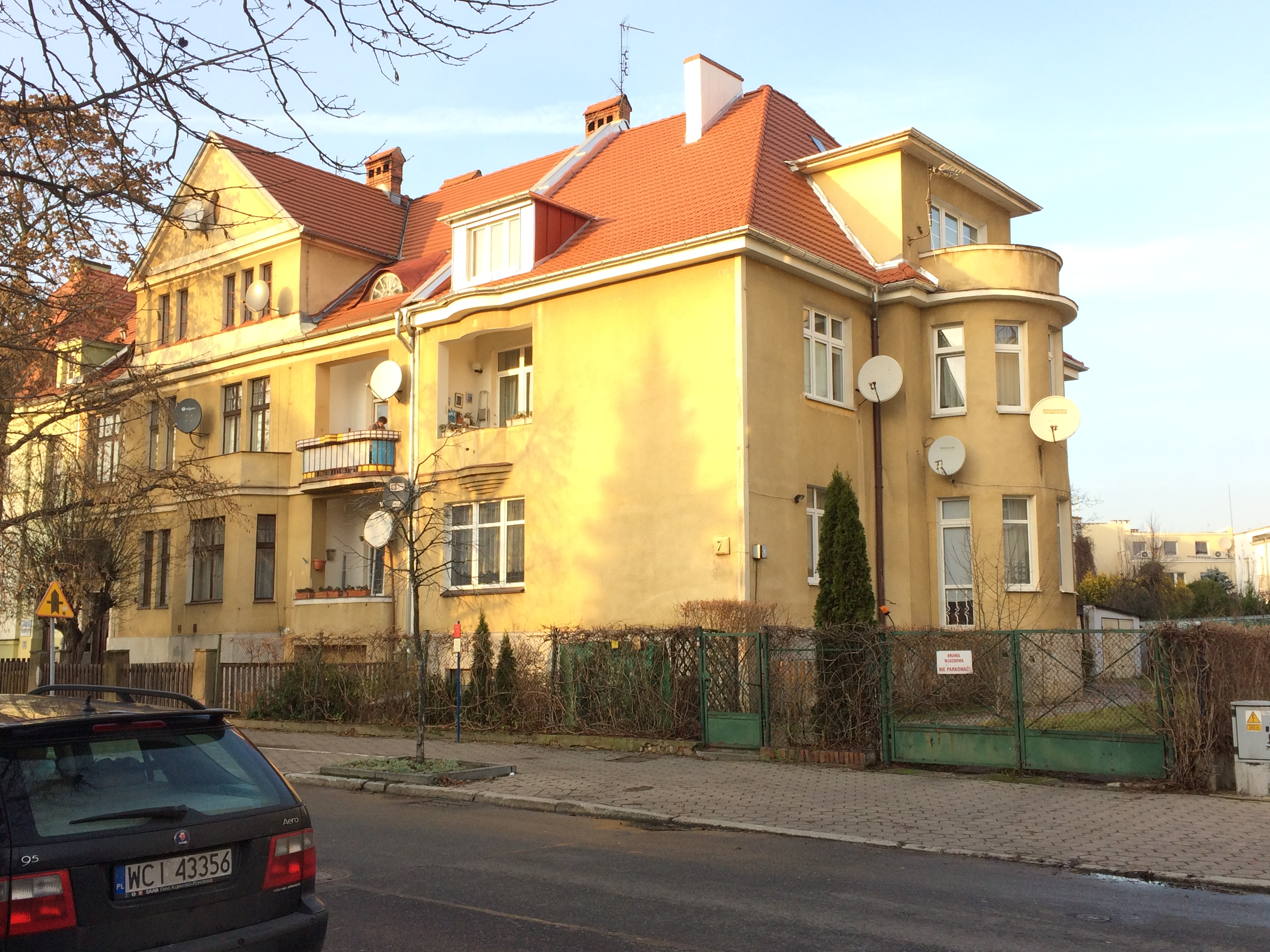
5 Kopernika Street

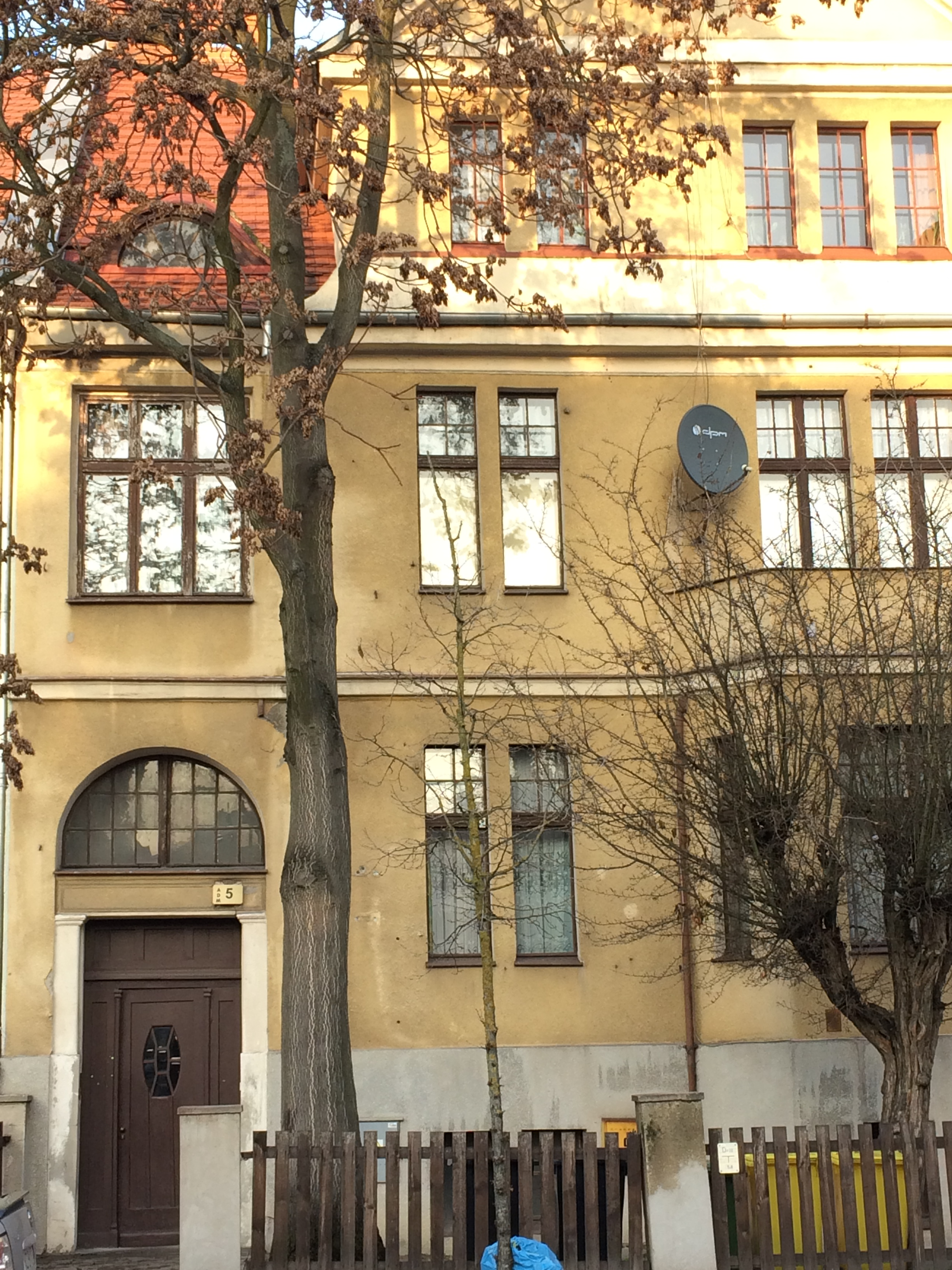
5 Kopernika Street, façade and entrance

=== House at 7a Kopernika street ===
The villa at 7a was built between 1933 and 1935. It was designed by Bolesław Polakiewicz. in the functionalist style. Polakiewicz designed 9 buildings Kopernika Street and Ossoliński Alley. The villa demonstrates cubic or rectangular forms, enhanced by curves and openings.

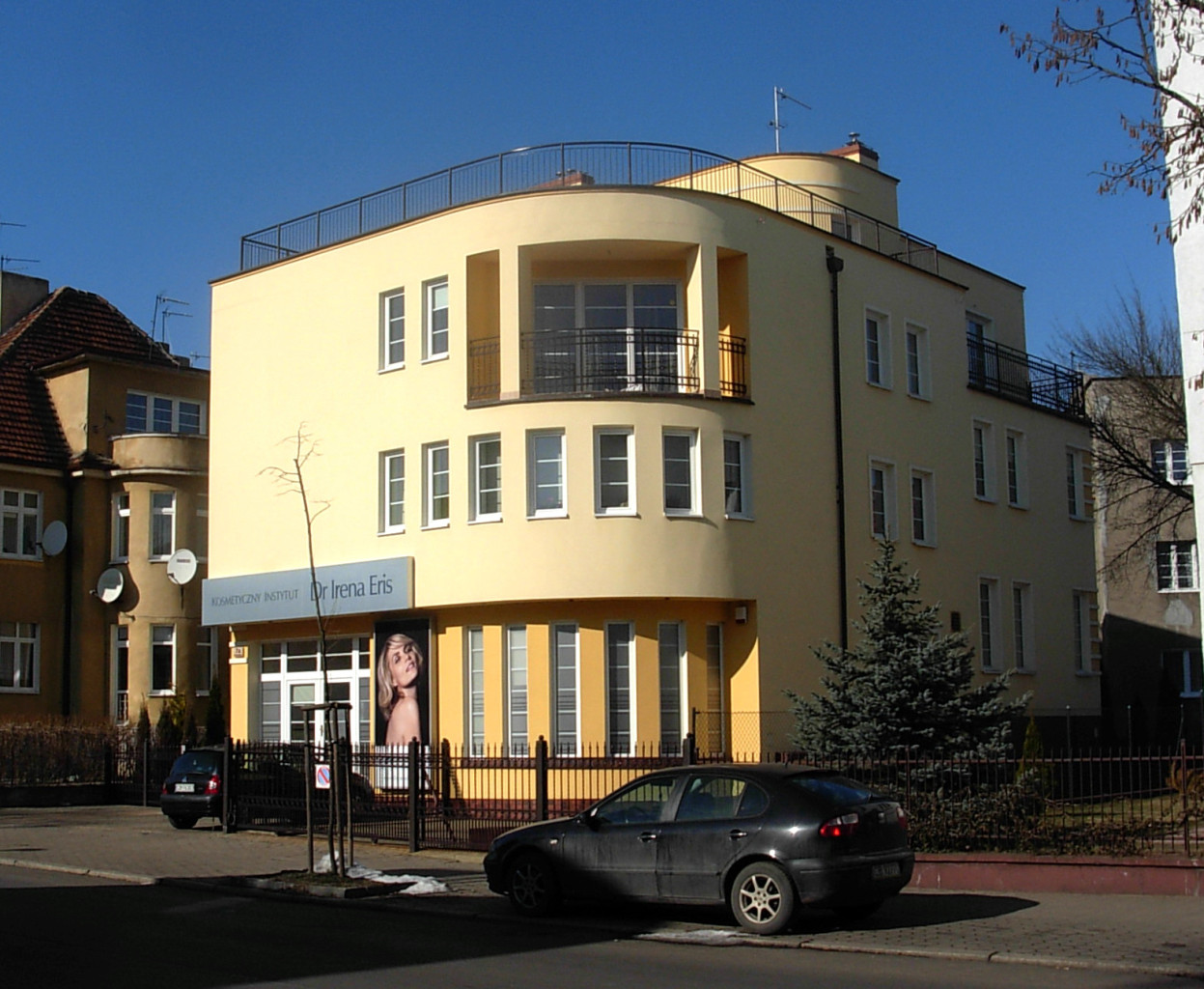
7a Kopernika Street

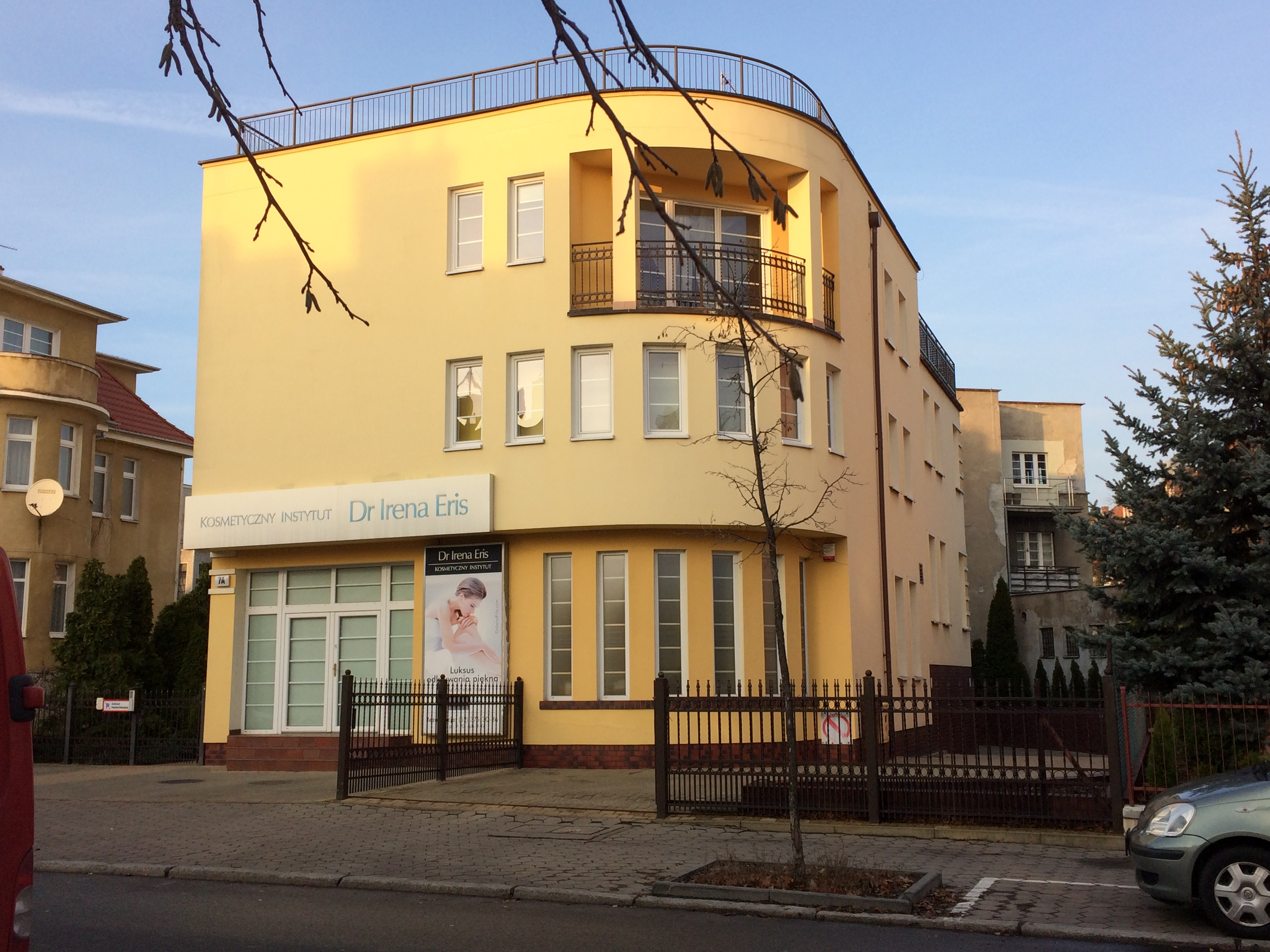
7a Kopernika Street, facade

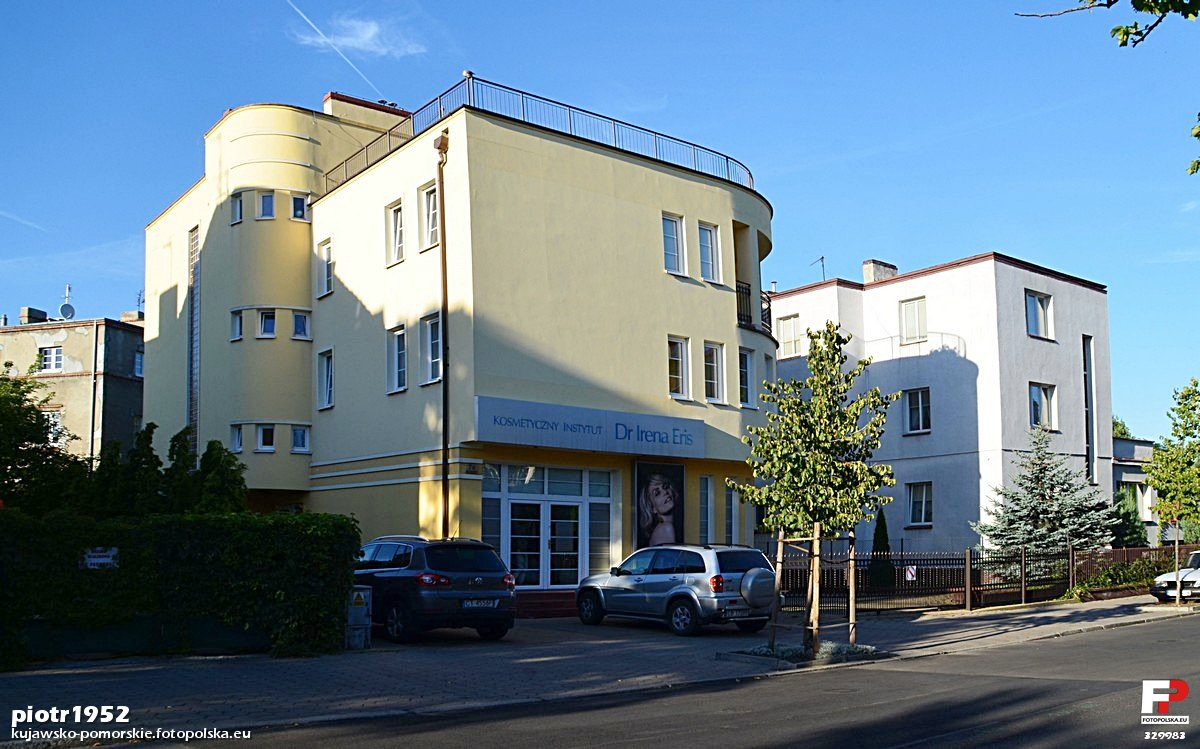
7a Kopernika Street and 9 Kopernika Street at the corner with Ossoliński Alley

=== Villa at 9 Kopernika Street ===
9 Kopernika Street was built between 1932 and 1933. It was another design by Bolesław Polakiewicz in the functionalist style. The villa is near the corner with Ossoliński Alley.

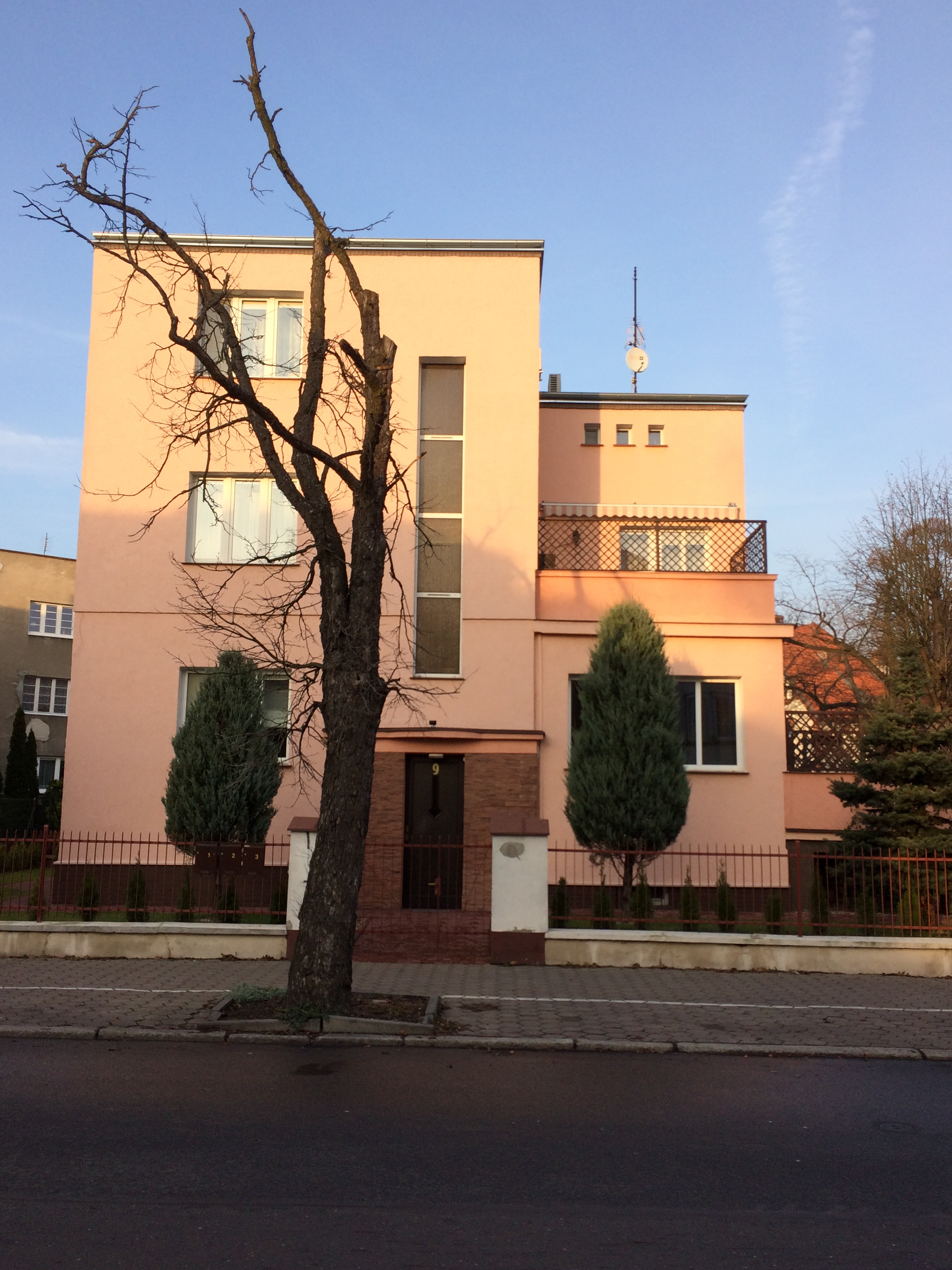
9 Kopernika Street

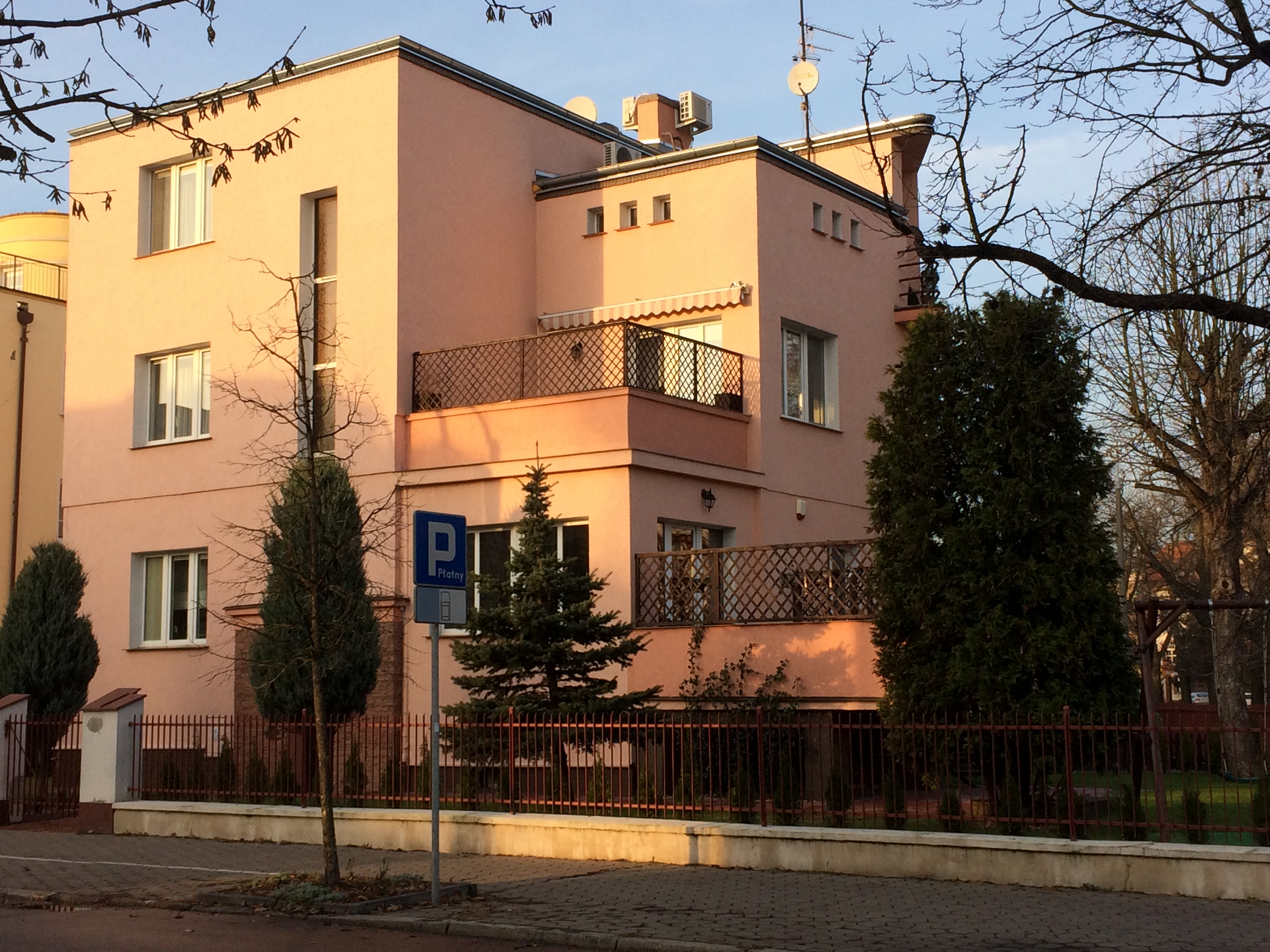
9 Kopernika Street from Ossoliński Alley

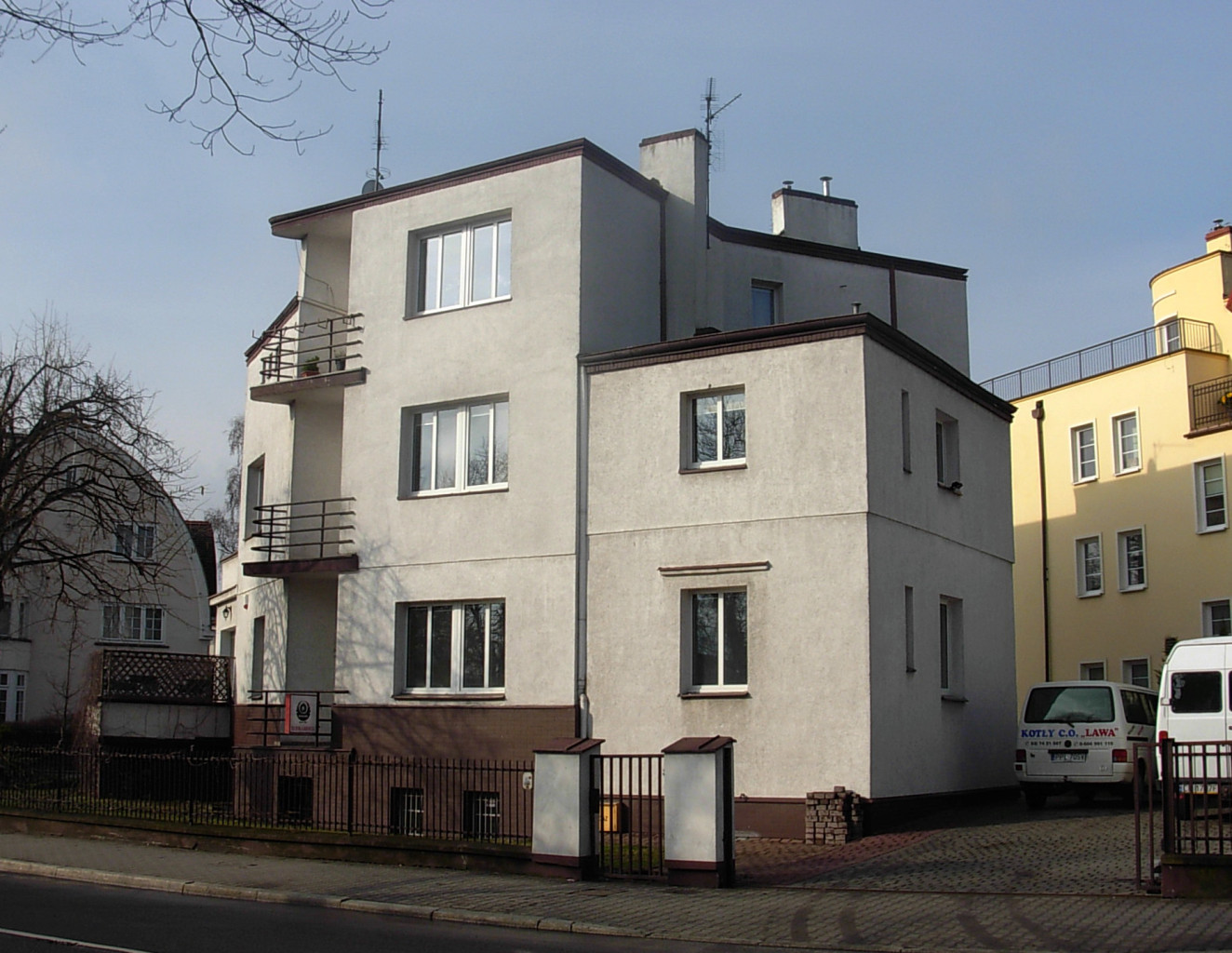
16 Kopernika Street (left), 9 Kopernika Street (centre) and 7a Kopernika Street (right)

=== Villa at 10 Kopernika street ===
10 Kopernika Street was built on the corner of Szenwalda Street between 1930 and 1931. It was designed by Stanisław Mankowski in a Polish national style with elements of functionalism. The house became a local branch of the Deutsche Bank. In 2005, the building underwent renovation. The main architectural elements of the building are the entrances on both streets, the avant-corps and the gables.

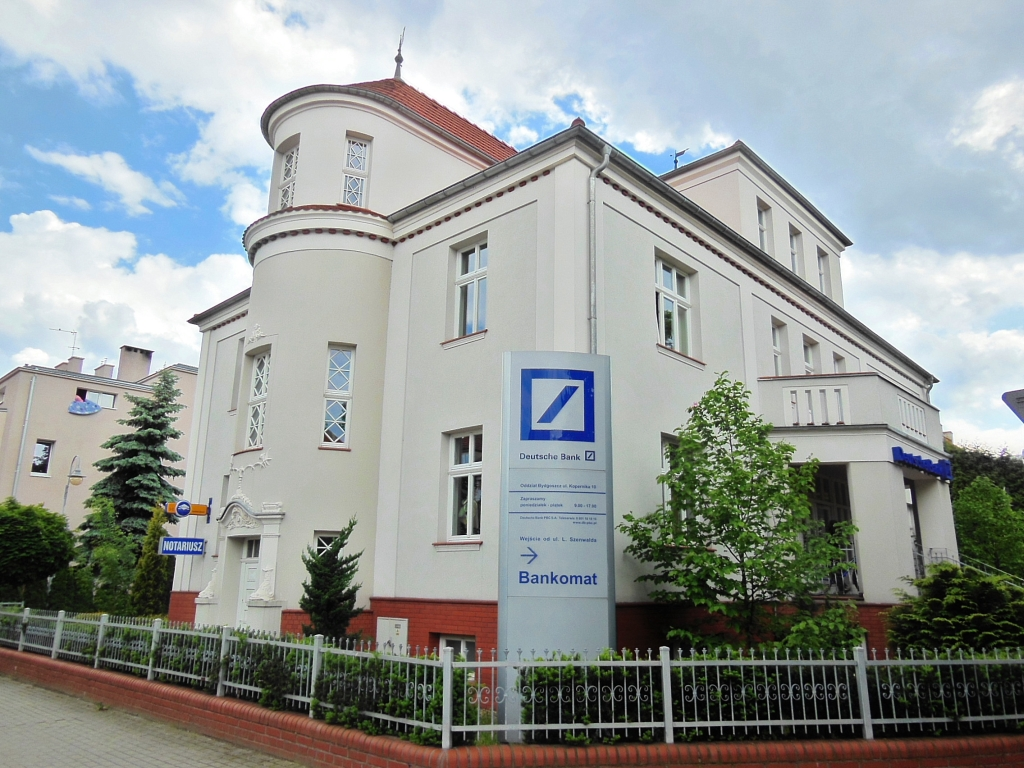
10 Kopernika Street

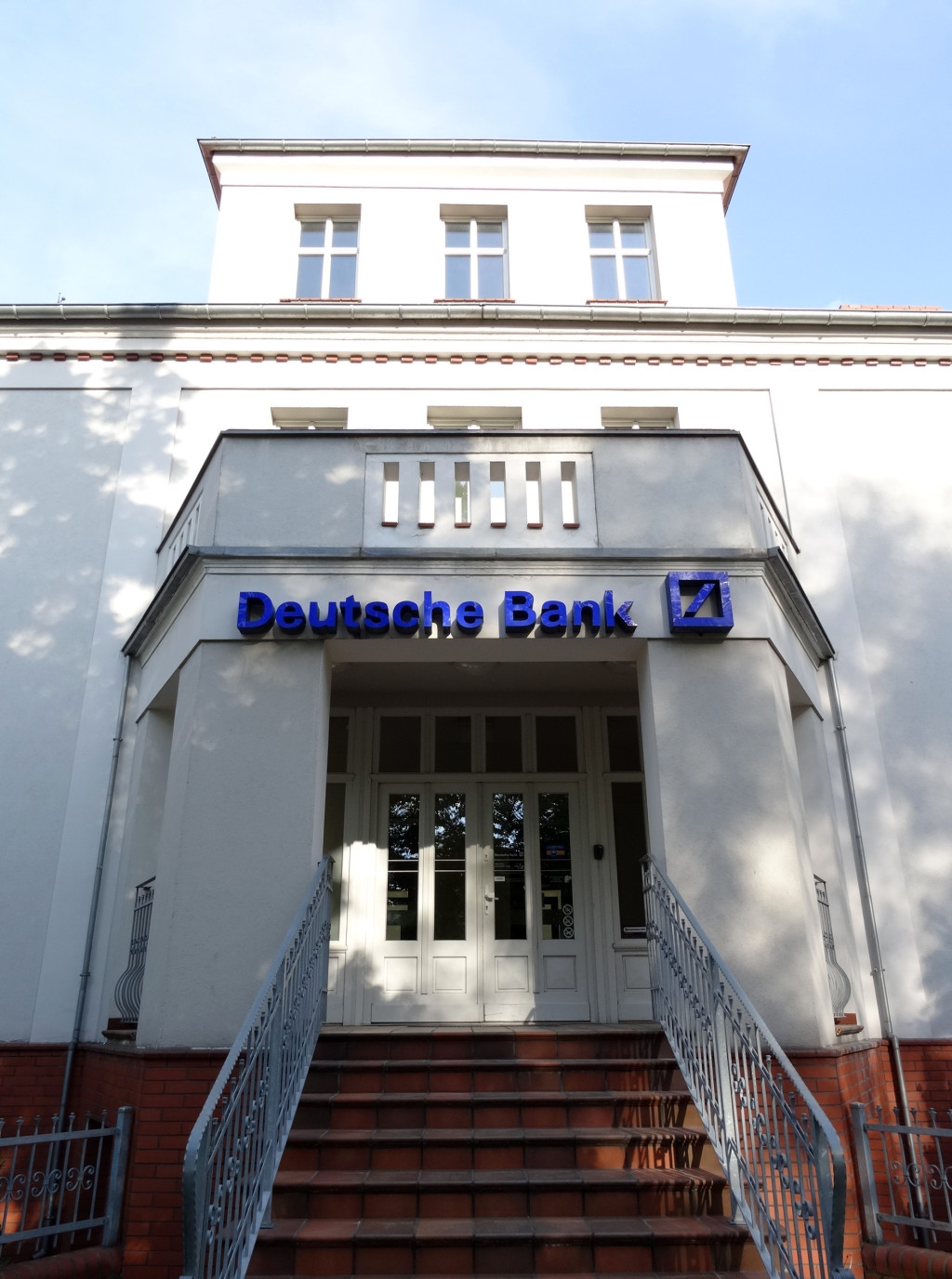
10 Kopernika Street, entrance to Szenwalda Street

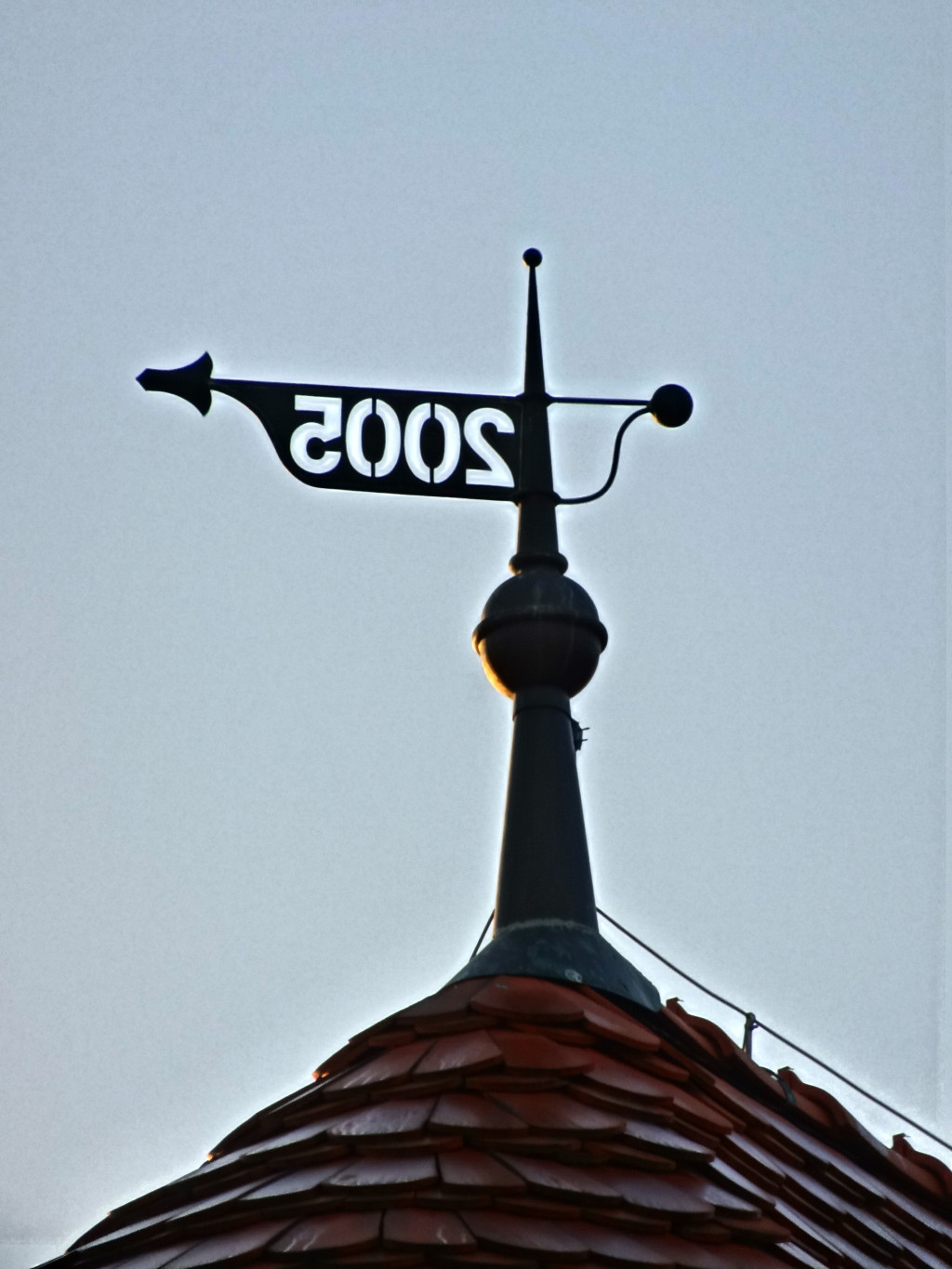
10 Kopernika Street, weather vane

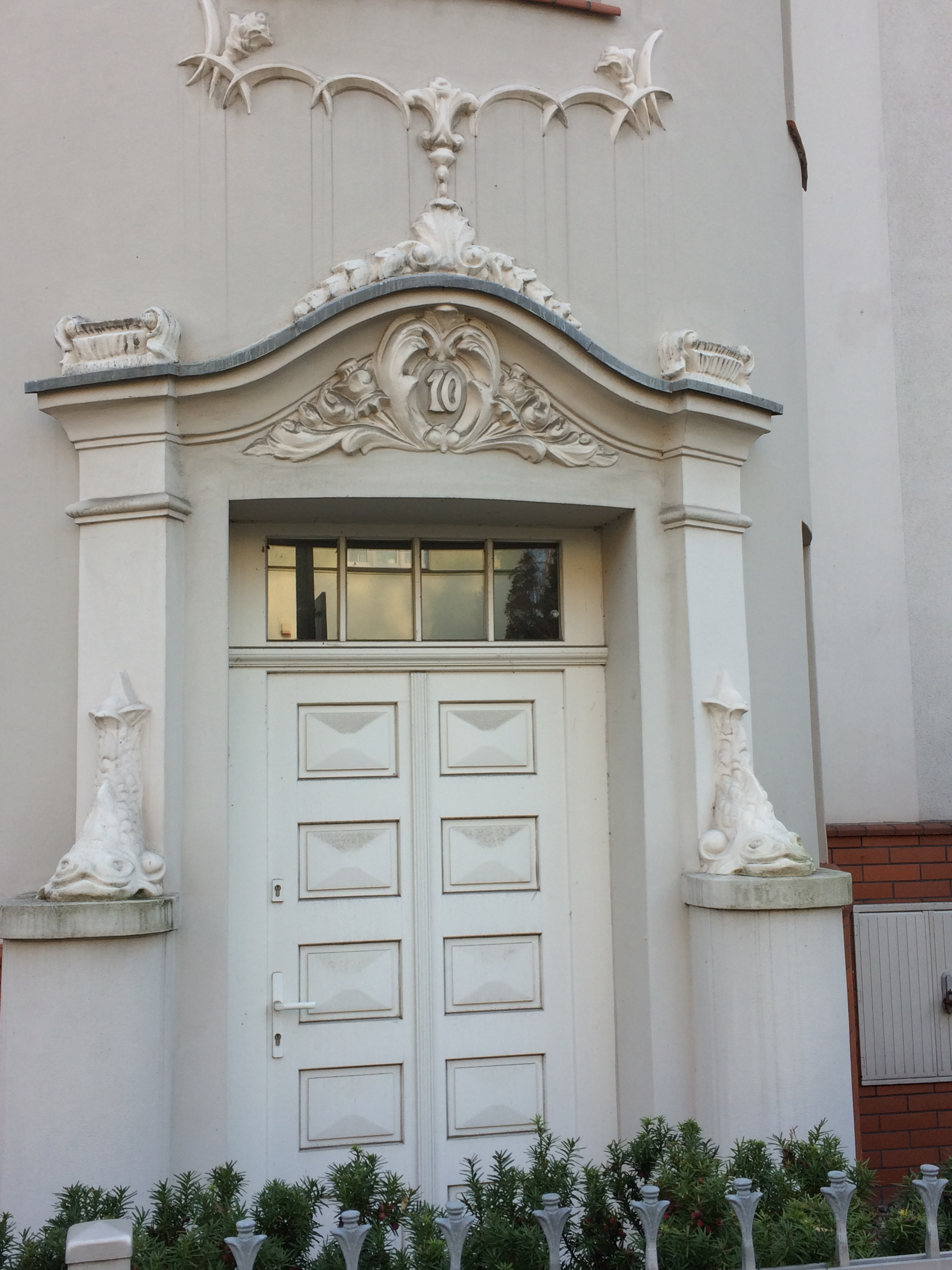
10 Kopernika Street, entrance

=== House at 12 Kopernika street ===
12 Kopernika Street was built between 1932 and 1936. It was designed in the functionalist style by engineer A. Knauff from Warsaw

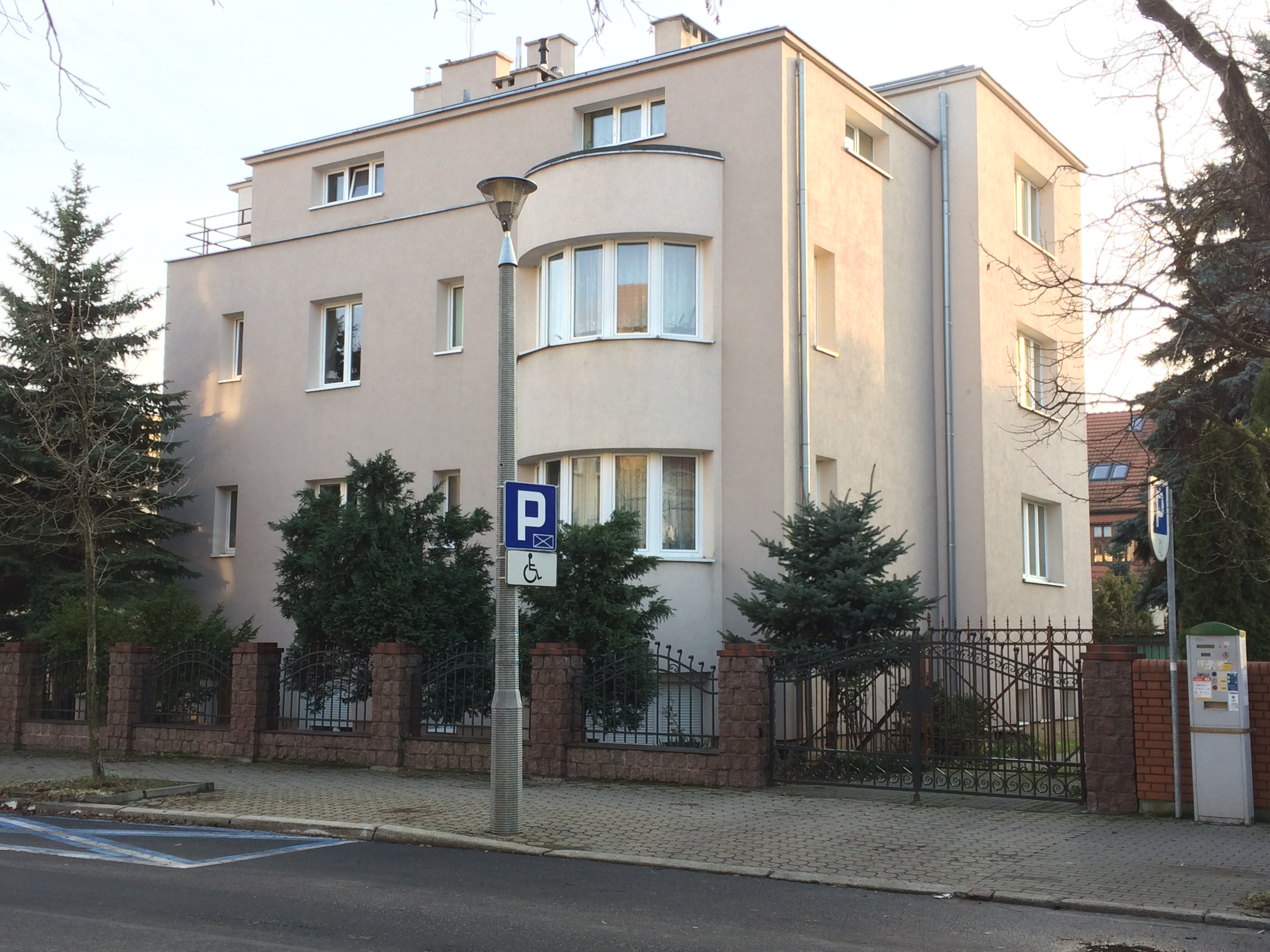
12 Kopernika Street

=== House at 14 Kopernika street ===
14 Kopernika Street was built in 1934 in the functionalist style. The house has its original vertical glass opening overhanging the entrance which allows light to enter each floor.

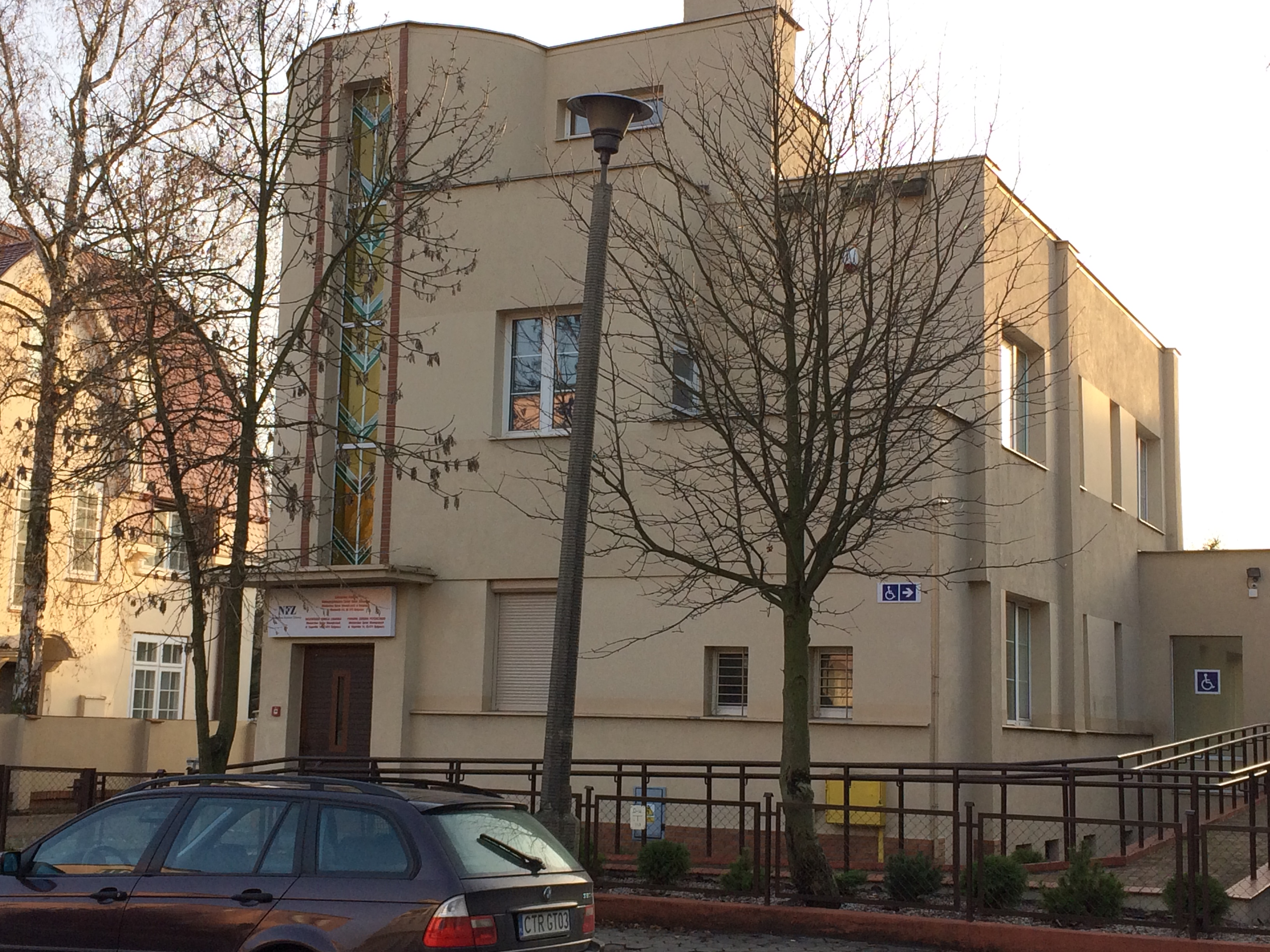
14 Kopernika Street

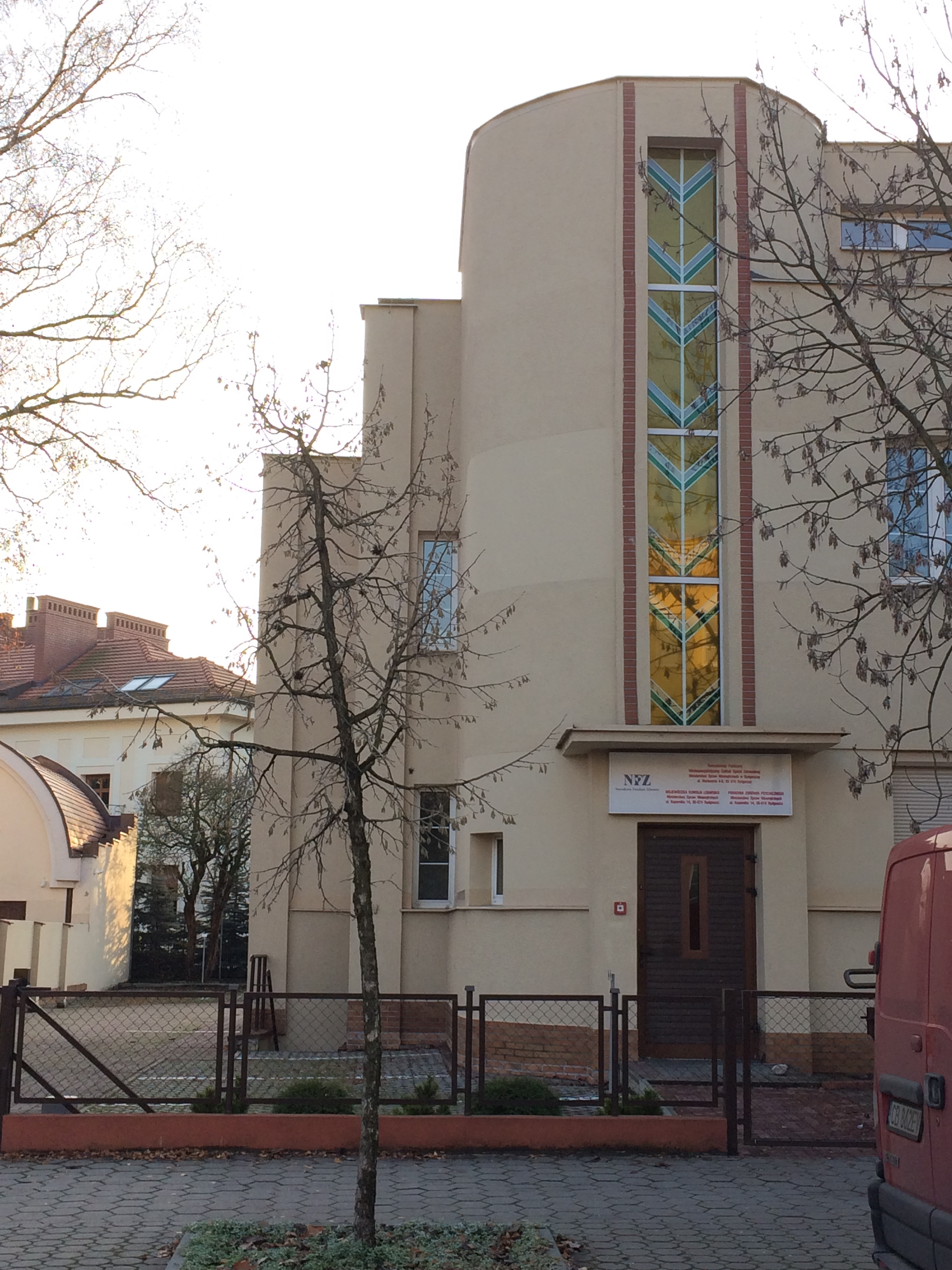
14 Kopernika Street, original vertical glass opening.

=== House at 16 Kopernika Street ===
The villa was built in 1933 in an early modernist style. It was listed on the Kuyavian-Pomeranian Voivodeship heritage list as number 601364, registration A/61/1-2, 20 January 2002.

The villa was commissioned by Antoni Weynerowski, the owner of a successful shoe factory, LEO. The shoe factory became KOBRA. The house was a wedding gift to his son, Witold and his wife Julia née Kessler. She was from the Netherlands, the daughter of a rich merchant and so the roof was designed in the Dutch style of de l'Orme. The villa was surrounded by beautiful gardens. After World War II, the villa became the property of the city and became a kindergarten for the children of members of the police force.

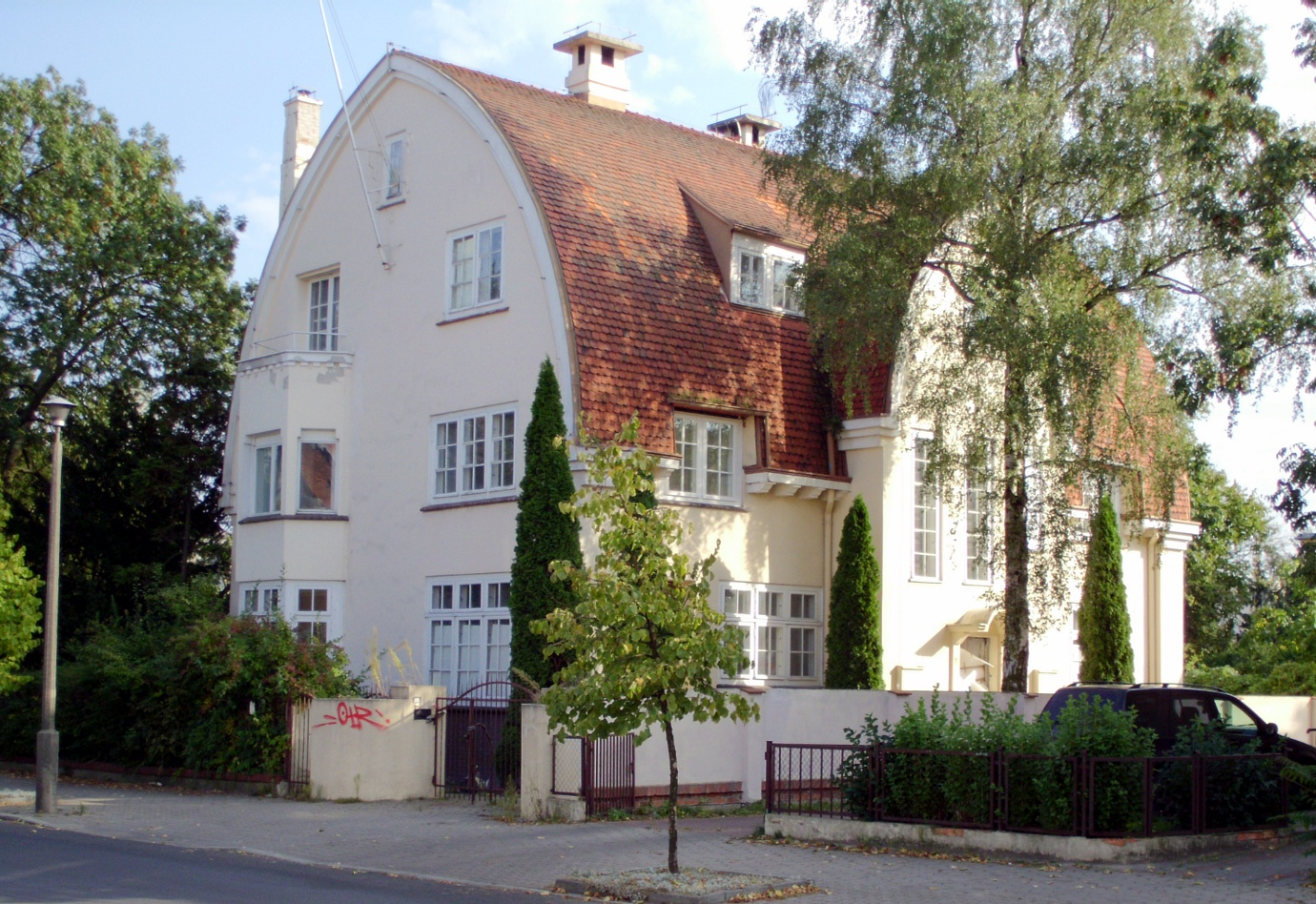
16 Kopernika Street

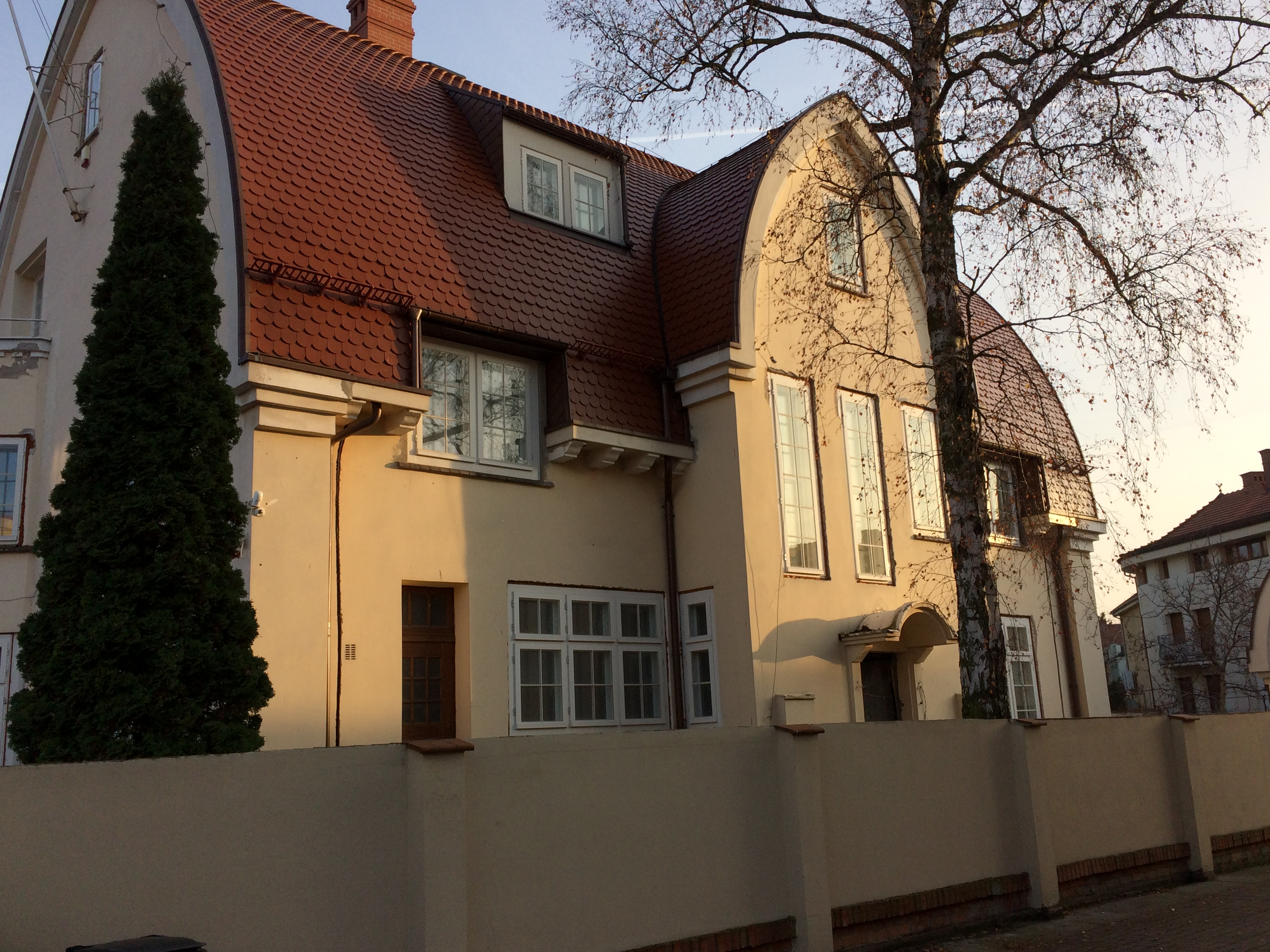
16 Kopernika Street from the garden

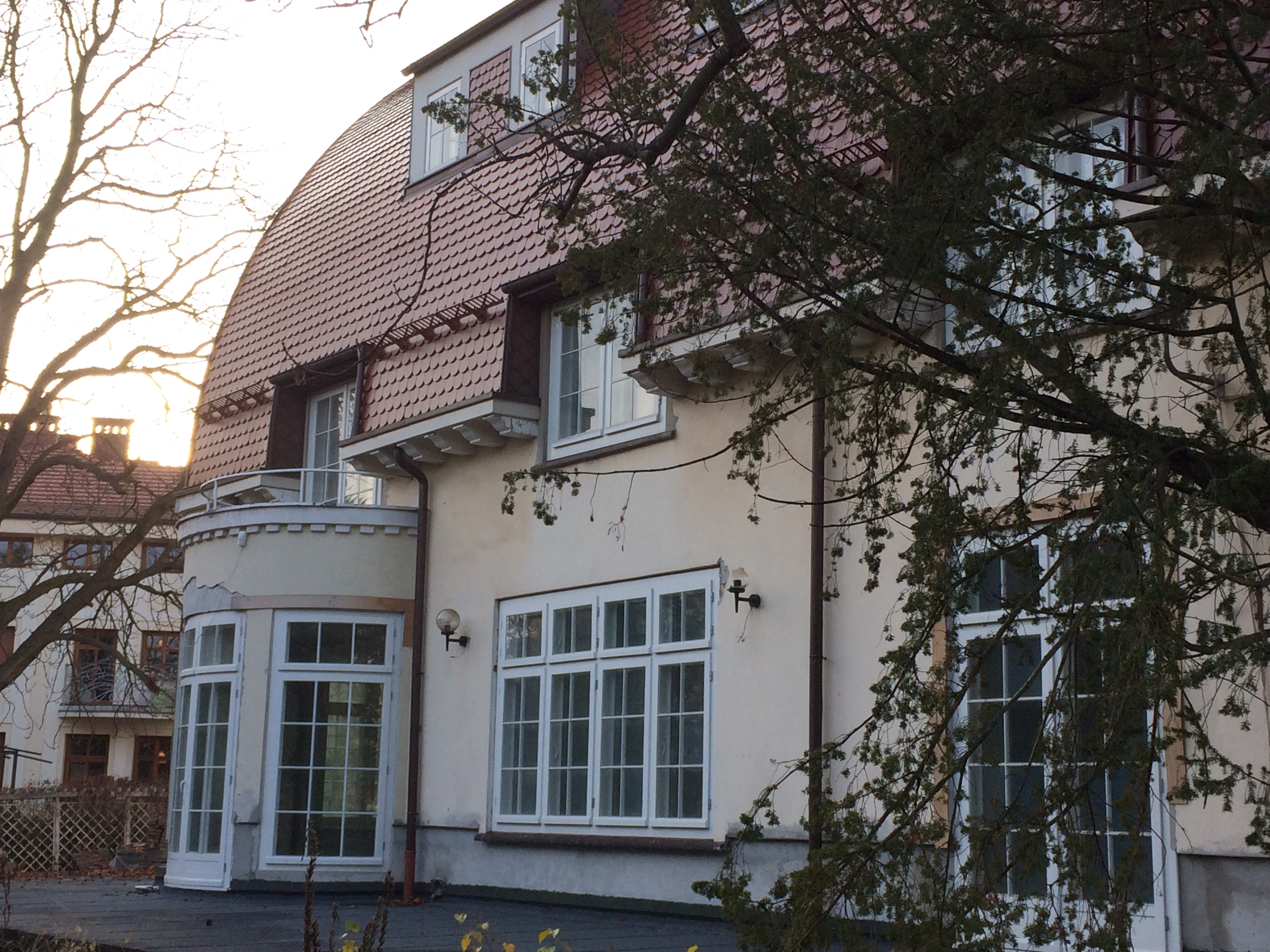
16 Kopernika Street, facade

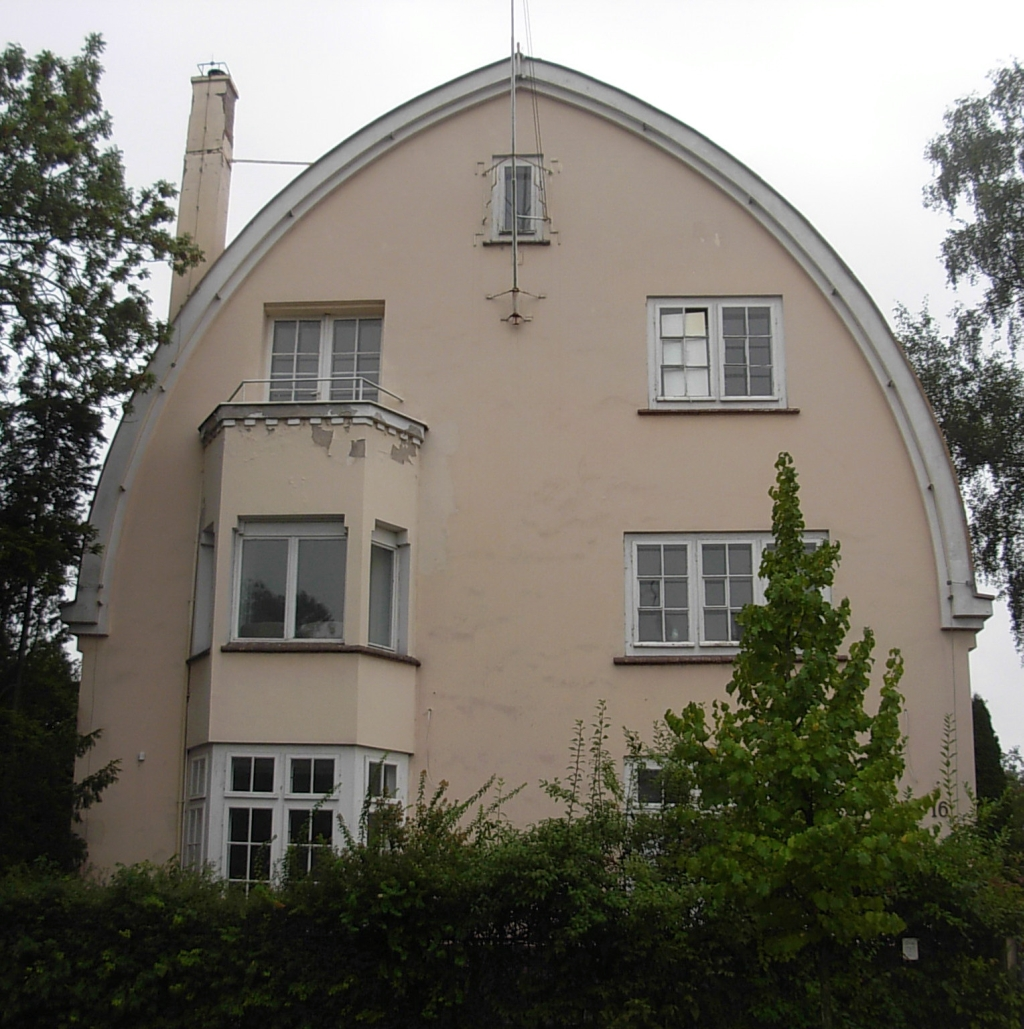
de l'Orme gable roof

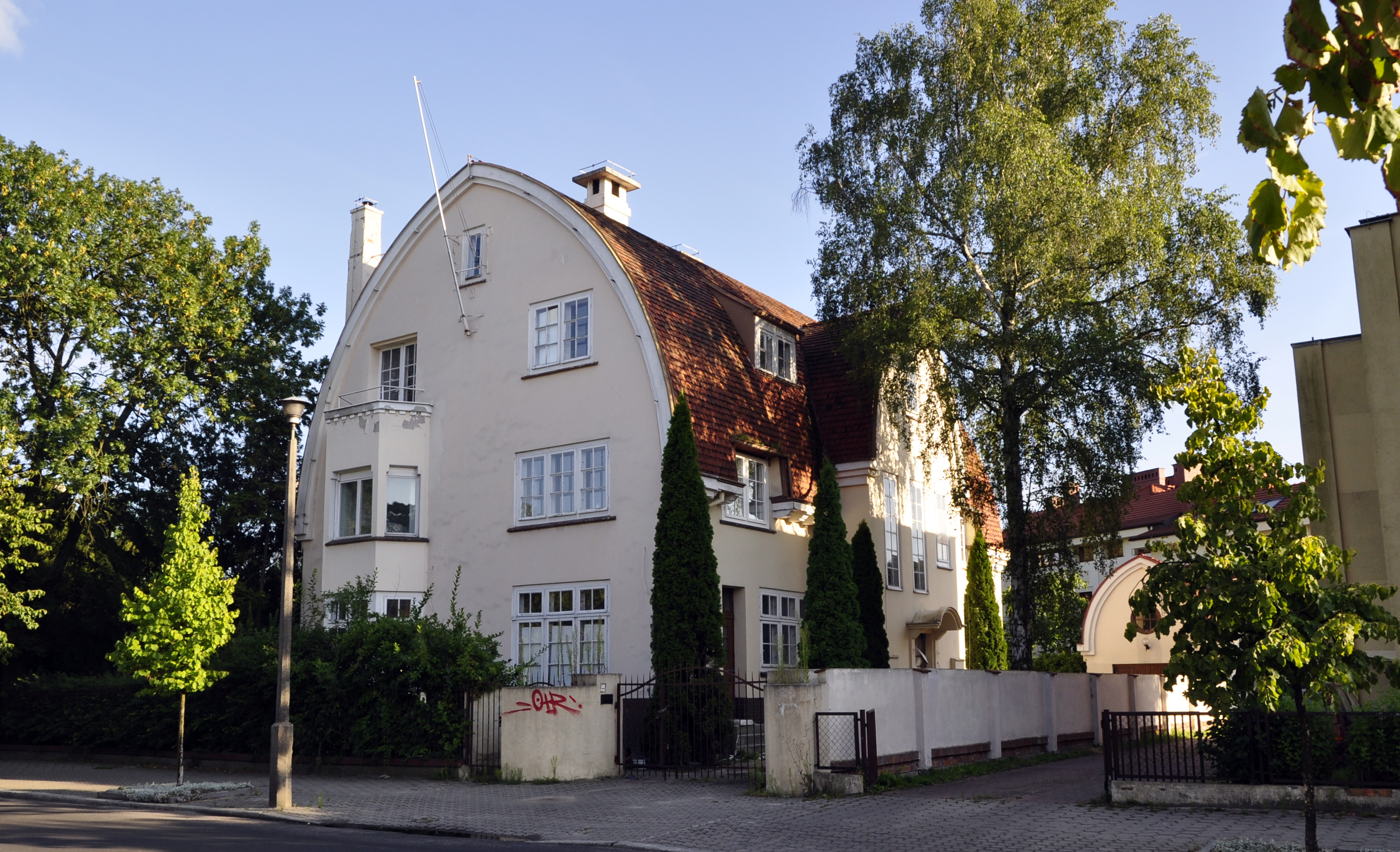
16 Kopernika street, gable of the garage building (right)

== See also ==
- Bydgoszcz
- Bydgoszcz Architects (1850-1970s)
- Pomeranian Philharmonic
- St. Vincent de Paul Basilica Minor in Bydgoszcz
- Kołłątaja street in Bydgoszcz
- High School No. 6, Bydgoszcz

== Bibliography ==
- (in Polish) Derkowska-Kostkowska, Bogna (1999). O zalozeniu Sielanki - bydgoskiego miasta ogrodu. Materiały do dziejow kultury i sztuki bydgoszczy z 4. Bydgoszcz: Pracownia Dokumentacji i Popularyzacji Zabytków Wojewódzkiego Ośrodka Kultury w Bydgoszczy. pp. 72–88.
- (in Polish) Kaczmarczyk, Henryk (1996). Budynek przy alei Ossolińskich. Kalendarz Bydgoski. Bydgoszcz: Towarzystwo Miłośników Miasta Bydgoszczy. pp. 111–113.
