= Kali (painter) =

Polish painter (1918–1998)

- Born: Hanna Gordziałkowska; December 18, 1918; Warsaw, Poland
- Died: June 20, 1998 (aged 79); San Francisco, California, United States
- Education: Academy of Fine Arts in Warsaw; Académie Royale des Beaux-Arts
- Spouse: Henryk "Henry" Weynerowski (1901–1988)
- Relatives: Antoni Weynerowski (father in-law)

Kali (Hanna Weynerowska, born Hanna Gordziałkowska; December 18, 1918 – June 20, 1998) was a Polish-born American painter known for her stylized portraits. She has been described as one of the most important Polish female painters. She was a World War II veteran of the Polish Resistance Movement after Nazi Germany occupied Poland, when she used the nom de guerre Kali. After emigrating and marrying, she used many variants of name, including "Hanna Kali Weynerowski", "Hanna Weynerowski-Kali", "Hanna Gordziałkowski-Weynerowski", "Hanka Weynerowska", and "Hanna Gordziałkowski", but she signed her paintings Kali.

== Work ==
The figures in her art resemble Old Masters in subject and positioning, but are painted in a simplified, flattened and more graphic manner. The paintings are brightly colored, often portraying the subject shown sitting at bust-length, with an elongated face, flattened body, a patterned element such as part of the clothing, and with the subject's hands positioned in a classical pose. Her work has been likened to a combination of Neo-mannerist and Surrealist.

== Life ==
Hanna Gordziałkowska was born on 18 December 1918 in Warsaw, Poland. She attended the Academy of Fine Arts in Warsaw, studying under Tadeusz Pruszkowski. Her education was interrupted by the invasion of Poland by Nazi Germany. She joined the Polish resistance movement, the Home Army (Armia Krajowa), using the nom de guerre Kali; she was a member of a women's sabotage unit. In the 1944 Warsaw Uprising, she was wounded and taken prisoner of war to Germany. Her prison camp was eventually liberated by the Soviet Army. She escaped from communist-governed Poland, aided by the U.S. military, to West Germany.

By 1945 she was living in Brussels, Belgium, and attending the Académie Royale des Beaux-Arts (ARBA) in Brussels to complete her arts education. In Brussels she married Henryk "Henry" Weynerowski (1901–88) a fellow Polish refugee and resistance fighter. For the next five years, she lived in Europe and exhibited her art in various countries, including France, Britain, Canada, Sweden, and Switzerland. She used many variants of her name after emigrating from Poland and marrying, including "Hanna Kali Weynerowski", "Hanna Weynerowski-Kali", "Hanna Gordziałkowski-Weynerowski", "Hanka Weynerowska", and "Hanna Gordziałkowski". Her paintings were simply signed Kali.

In 1953 she moved with her husband to San Francisco, California, where they lived until their deaths.

She died on 20 June 1998 in San Francisco. In her will, she requested that her 86 paintings be transferred to the Polish Museum in Rapperswil, Switzerland. The paintings were missing for sixteen years until early 2014, when FBI agents visited her nephew in Santa Rosa, California. Her nephew explained that 75 of the missing paintings were in a storage facility; they were returned to the museum.

== Exhibitions ==
- 1950: Galerie des Garets, Paris, France
- 1950: London Gallery, London, England
- 1950: Palais de Beaux-Arts, Brussels, Belgium
- 1952: Weyhe Gallery, New York, New York, US
- 1953: São Paulo Art Biennial (Bienal Do Museu De Arte Moderna), São Paulo, Brazil
- 1955: California Palace of the Legion of Honor, San Francisco, California, US
- 1962: M.H. de Young Memorial Museum, San Francisco, California, US
- 1963: Gallery 63 Inc., New York, New York, US
- 2014: Polish Museum, Rapperswil, Switzerland
- 2019: Polish Museum, Rapperswil, Switzerland
