= Antoni Weynerowski =

Polish entrepreneur (1864–1939)

Antoni Karol Weynerowski
- Born: 12 June 1864; Bromberg, Kingdom of Prussia
- Died: 29 November 1939 (aged 75); Brest, Soviet Union
- Occupation: Entrepreneur
- Years active: 1891–1939
- Known for: Founder of Leo shoe factory
- Relatives: Kali (daughter in-law)

Antoni Weynerowski (12 June 1864 – 29 November 1939) was a Prussian-born Polish entrepreneur. He was founder of the firm Leo in Bydgoszcz, renamed Kobra, one of the largest shoe manufacture in Poland in the interwar period.

== Biography ==
Antoni was born on 12 June 1864, in Bromberg, as Bydgoszcz was named under Prussian rule. His mother was Joanna, née Olesek. His father, Wiktor Weynerowski, was the founder of a small felt shoe business: the pairs, produced at home, were sold by Weronika, Antoni's sister, peddling in the streets to find a buyer. With the growth of the industry, a factory was acquired, today non-existent, at the crossing of Swiętej Trojcy street and Jagiellońska street.

After graduation from gymnasium, he worked in his father's company, located on two sites: Kastanien Allee (today's Kącik street) and Albert straße (Garbary Street). He took over management of the firm in 1891, which for this occasion was rebranded "W. Weynerowski and son Shoe Factory" (Polish: W. Weynerowski i syn Fabryka Obuwia). In 1906, he had a new workplant built at Sedan Straße (today's Chocimska street), where about 300 people worked. When his father died in 1917, Antoni became the legal owner of the factory. Furthermore, he also inherited:

- a steam sawmill combined with a furniture factory at Jagiellońska street, then at 45 Promenada street;
- a villa at 165 Toruńska Street;
- a tenement at 61 Gdańska street, which also housed the furniture shop.

In 1920, Antoni Weynerowski, purchased a large property estate in Myślęcinek (341 hectares (840 acres)), a wooden district on the north of Bydgoszcz. This property was mainly used by the family as a place for hunting and recreation. Its management was given to Mr. Jaranowski, the husband of Leokadia's sister.

In the 1920s, the newly-wed couple lived in several places in Bydgoszcz: at 21 Swiętej Trojcy street, then at 14 Schiller straße (present day 12 Paderewskiego street) and at 50 Toruńska street.

At the time of the rebirth of Polish state in 1920, Antoni became a temporary counselor at the Bydgoszcz town council, as an honorary member. Acting in the background, he supported the Polish national movement by sponsoring education and the unemployed. In 1929, he handed over the factory to his sons Henryk and Witold: in their turn, they transformed in 1931, the enterprise into a share company named "LEO" Fabryka Obuwia SA" (English: LEO Shoe factory SA), named in memoriam of their mother Leokadia and their gone brother Leon. The firm was one of the largest in Poland. In the 1920s, "LEO" had been producing daily 200 pairs of leather, felt, sports shoes and slippers.

At the end of the 1930s, the Weynerowskis bought an area of land in the vicinity of Kraków, planning to build a factory and family houses for workers there, but the outset of WWII thwarted their scheme. They also acquired tenements in Bydgoszcz, at Kościuszki street.

When German troops entered Bydgoszcz in September 1939, Antoni fled with his family to the east. During the occupation, the "LEO" factory was taken over by Nazis, while the sawmill machines and devices were dismantled and taken to Piła. On its stead, the Germans organized car workshops using the remaining buildings and halls.

The Weynerowskis reached Warsaw then Red Army-occupied Brest on the Bug river. There, on 15 October, Antoni was hospitalized for exhaustion and dementia and died on 29 November 1939. It is not known where his grave is located in Belarus today.

In 2018, Polish newsmagazine Wprost ranked Antoni Weynerowski among the 100 wealthiest Poles of the 20th century.

=== Philanthropy and social activities ===
Leokadia and Antoni were known to be generous philanthropists in the city society, under Prussian and Polish rules. Indeed, in March 1920, the Weynerowski family donated 1,000 marks for books for the sick, as well as "shoes and boots" for nurses from the hospital in Bydgoszcz, where wounded soldiers fighting the Polish–Soviet War were cared after. Furthermore, they provided financial help to the local shelter for the Blind and the wounded soldiers associations.

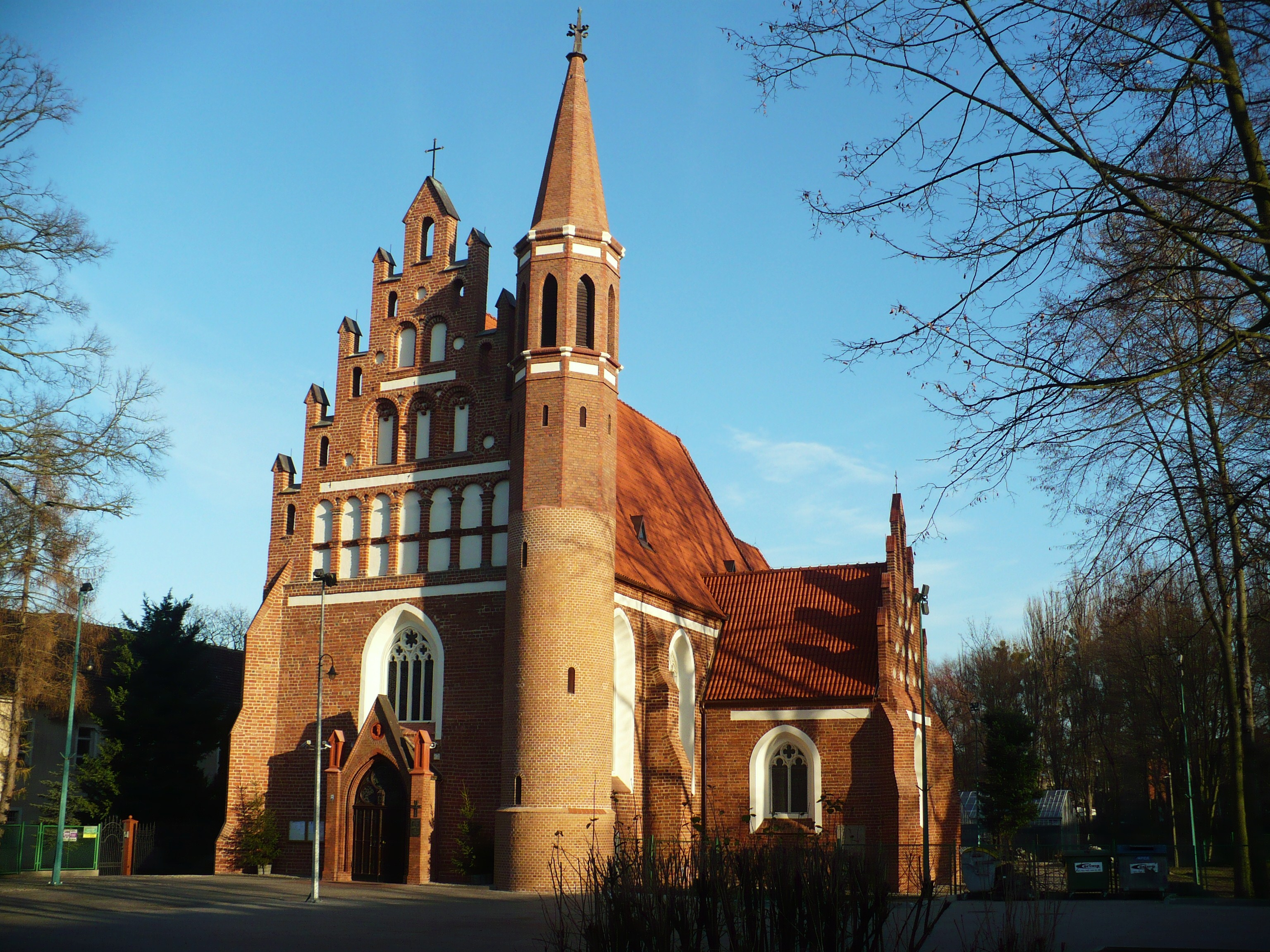
View of the garrison church today

After the conflicts, the couple gave in 1922, 10,000 marks for students from the Dąbrowski school in Szwederowo district for "purchasing books and notebooks". It had also become a tradition for them to prepare gifts for the poor during the pre-Christmas period: Leokadia and Antoni funded packages for the orphanages in which one could be certain to find shoes.

The Weynerowskis were in addition close to the parish life. In June 1920, Antoni Weynerowski donated 80,000 marks for the Church of Our Lady of Perpetual Help in the Szwederowo district. A year later, the couple was among the people who contributed to the renovation of the Poor Clares' Church in downtown. In May 1923, Antoni Weynerowski donated 500,000 marks for the garrison church where was attached the parish priest, Father Morakowski. The Polish literary Adam Grzymała-Siedlecki contributed has well with 50,000 marks.

Leokadia and Antoni regularly attended charity balls for the displaced students and families from Eastern Borderlands.

Besides, in June 1934, the "LEO" sports club was established at the factory, with different sections, among others: women's sports, table tennis, boxing, cycling and football.

=== Commemorations ===
On 1 September 2012, an information plaque has been unveiled at the corner of Kościuszki and Chocimska streets, where stands the building of the ancient factory. It depicts the history of the factory and its importance in the city at the time.

== "LEO" (renamed "KOBRA") company ==
In memoriam of Antoni's wife, Leokadia, and their first son Leon, the name "Leo" was chosen for the branding of the shoe company in the late 1920s.

== See also ==
- Kali (painter)
- Polish Americans
- Polish Canadians
- List of Polish people

== Bibliography ==
- Gizela Chmielewska, Hanka Sowińska (16 April 1993). Saga rodu Weynerowskich (in Polish). Bydgoszczc: Ilustrowany Kurier Polski. pp. 118–119.
- Grysińska, Katarzyna (2021). Weynerowscy – od butów i dobrych uczynków. Kronika Bydgoska XLI (in Polish). Bydgoszcz: Towarzystwo Miłosnikow Miasta Bydgoszczy. pp. 157–181.
