= Ludwik Regamey =

Polish construction engineer, 20th century

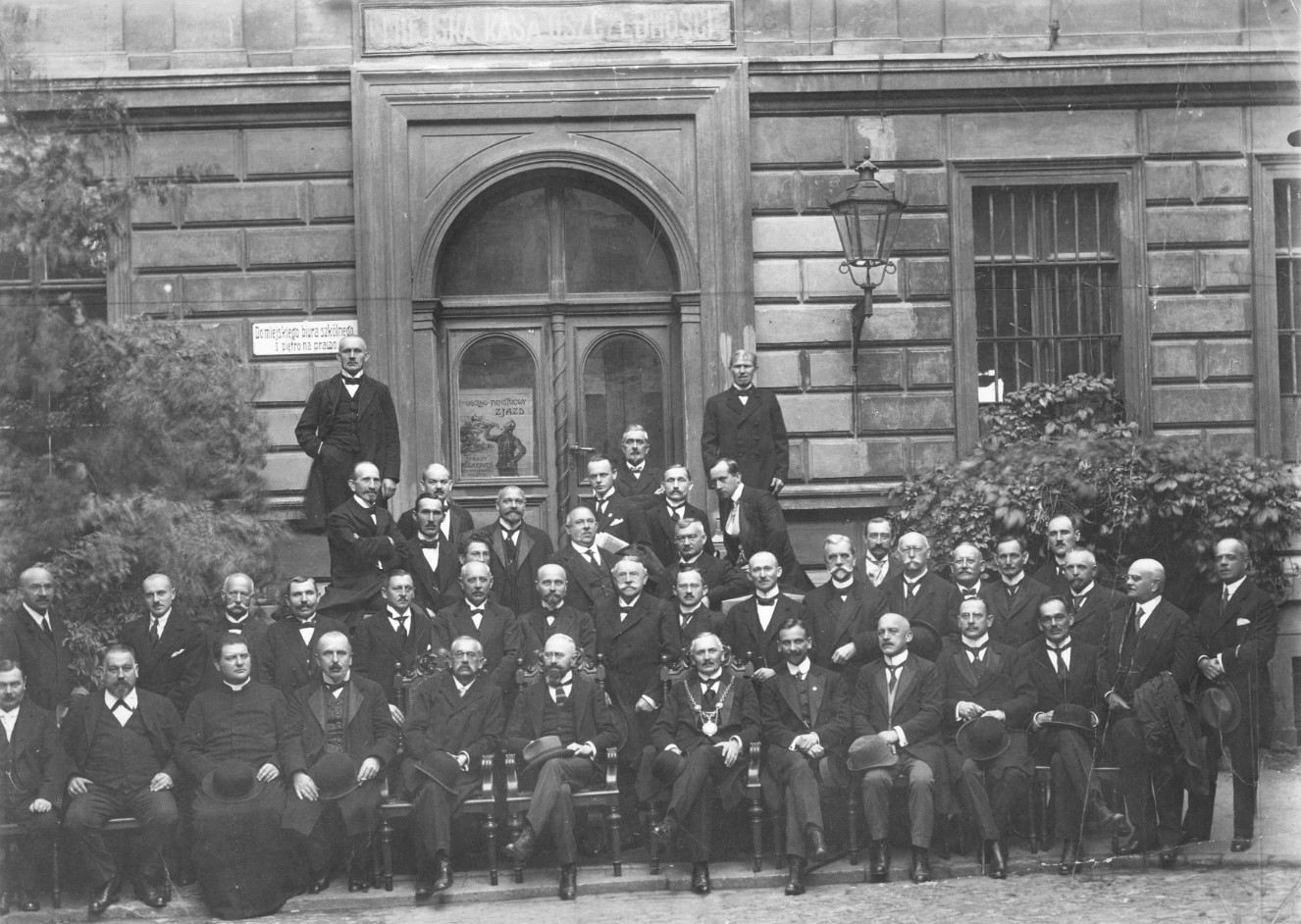
- Ludwik Regamey (frong row, first from the right) in 1922
- Born: May 20, 1877; Kyiv, Russian Empire
- Died: February 8, 1967 (aged 89); Toulouse, France
- Occupations: Engineer, musician
- Known for: Franco-Polish association

Ludwik Regamey (1877-1967) was a Polish construction engineer by trade. He worked in Bydgoszcz where he had a very active associative life as a musician. He was the first chairman of the Alliance Française in Bydgoszcz. After moving to France in 1934, he was a formidable promoter of French and Polish culture exchanges till his demise in 1977, in Toulouse.

== Biography ==
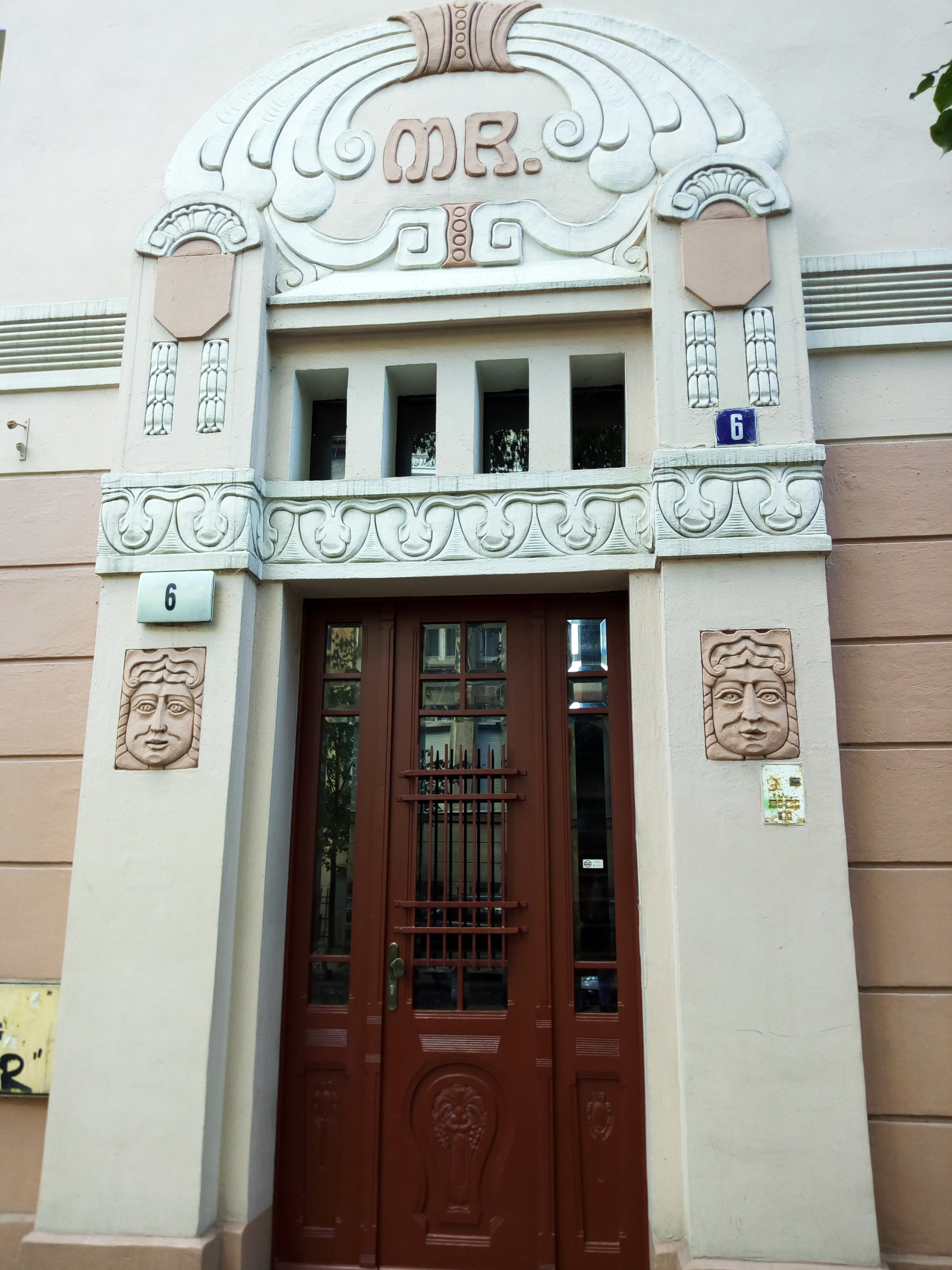
Entrance of 6 Zamoyskiego street, Ludwik's first house in Bydgoszcz

The Regameys established in Switzerland in the 17th century: the great-grandfather left the country when his shoe making business collapsed. He moved to Vilnius (known at the time as Wilno), then in the Russian Empire. His son Louis, Ludwik grandfather, married there a Polish girl: he worked as a French teacher. In the wake of the Polish Uprising of 1863, the family left Polish-Lithuania territory to Russian Kyiv. As a Swiss citizen, he officially became in 1883, a Tsarist civil servant. Louis fathered two sons, Casimir Ludwigovitch (1859-1907) and Rudolf Felix Gabriel Ludwigovitch (1852-1891), Ludwik's father.

Rudolf Felix Gabriel married Marianna, née Zeleney: she had Hungarian blood but was a great Polish patriot. Ludwik was born on May 20, 1877, in Kyiv: he was their first child. Soon, two brothers and a sister will follow. He graduated from the Faculty of Construction at the Lviv Polytechnic and afterwards expanded his professional knowledge in Zürich. He got married with Kazimiera, née Spław-Neyman, and moved to Voronezh, Russian Empire There he sired two children: Rudolf born in 1905, and Regina in 1914. In 1915, Rudolf got infected by typhus, while bringing cigarettes and food to German POW transported through Voronezh by railroad. He died the same year: this ordeal left a lasting scar on the Regamey marriage as Ludwik constantly blamed his wife for leaving their son without surveillance in such hazardous places.

The 1917 Russian Revolution tore apart this life: at 40, Ludwik, as a strong patriot, joined the growing Polish army and took part to the resulting Polish–Soviet War (1919-1920). Once demobilized and looking for a place to settle anew with his family, relatives from Kyiv who had already stayed in Bydgoszcz incited them to move there from Lviv.

Their first abode was at 6 Jana Zamoyskiego Street, room Nr.36. A few months later (1921), as Kazimierza's aunt, evacuated similarly from Ukraine, established in Paderewskiego Street, the Regameys moved to Józef Weyssenhoff Square, then called Plac Zacisze.

=== Life in Bydgoszcz ===
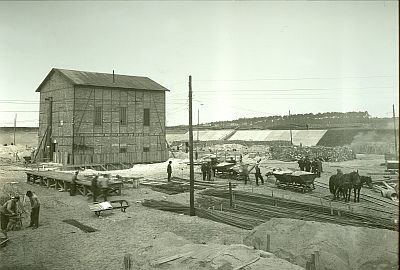
Jachcice Power plant ca 1928

From October 1921 to March 1934, Ludwik worked as a building counselor of the Municipal Office for Underground Construction and Municipal Power Engineering: his working life revolved around issues related to the development of municipal housing. One of his main contribution at this position was to have the municipal power plant in Jachcice realized. On behalf of the city magistrate, Ludwik, together with engineers Markowicz and Missir, supervised the entire investment, which began in January 1927. He was considered at the time as the best construction manager in Bydgoszcz.

Due to his official duties, Ludwik often represented the magistrate during important ceremonies. Hence on November 29, 1927, he took part with the Bydgoszcz delegation, including Witold Bełza the director of the City Library, to the funerals of Stanisław Przybyszewski. On September 17, 1928, he participated to an unveiling ceremony of a monument to the Russian soldiers who died during World War I, at the war cemetery in Szubińska street in Bydgoszcz, today the municipal cemetery in Kcyńska street. On December 21, 1929, Ludwik Regamey, together with a group including General Wiktor Thommée, received Jędrzej Moraczewski, then minister of public works and representatives from the Ministry of Industry and Trade, from the Poznań Voivodeship, diplomats and scholars for a visit of the Jachcice power plant, followed by a banquet at the Pod Orłem hotel. In parallel, Ludwik gave several lectures on city investments.

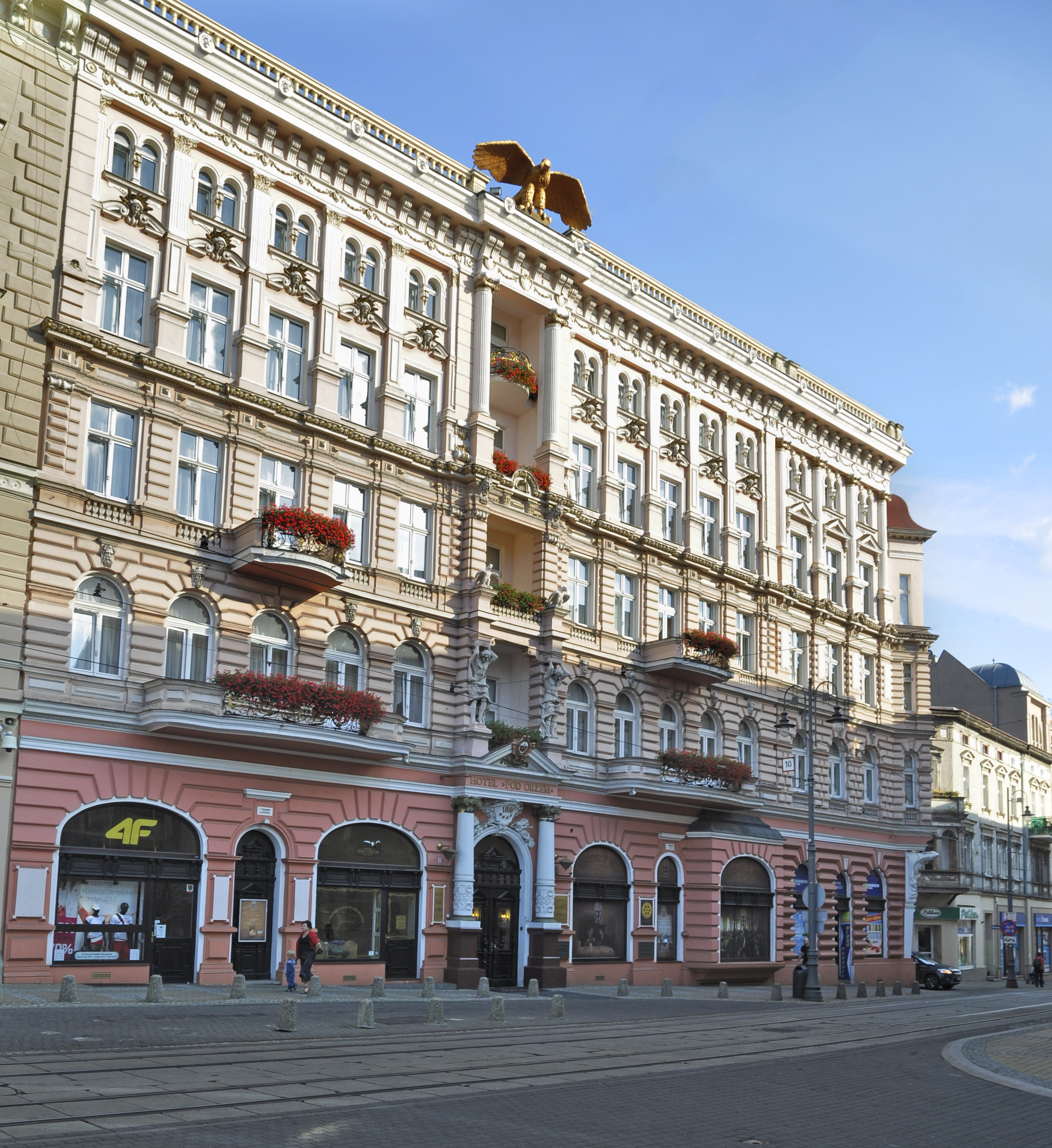
Pod Orłem hotel where receptions were held

In the spring of 1923, Marie Strowska came to Bydgoszcz to organize French courses, as part of an official program carried out by the French government in Pomerania and Greater Poland. Maria's father was Fortunat Strowski, a French academic with Polish origins, a literary historian, essayist and critic lecturer at the Faculté des lettres de Paris. Elegant and energetic, she quickly charmed the inhabitants of Bydgoszcz.

In the mid-1920s, Regamey separated from Kazimiera who then lived with their daughter in a flat at Jana Zamoyskiego Street. On October 9, 1924, together with his new wife Marie, he moved to the apartment 6 at 3 Cieszkowskiego Street. Maria Janina, Marie's daughter, born in 1921, lived in Switzerland for the first seven years of her life, though she was legitimated in 1924 by the marriage in Wilno between Marie Strowski and Ludwik Regamey, her parents. A month later (November 1924), Maria launched at their home a private preparatory school, the Seine French courses-Institut D’etudes Francaises, which, thanks to his father, presented diplomas signed by professors from Paris University. The success was so unexpected that the house at 3 Cieszkowskiego was not large enough to hold end-of-school celebrations. To mitigate this, she cooperated with the State Industrial School (Polish: Państwowa Szkoła Przemysłowa) and used the institution's auditorium, with the help of Franciszek Siemiradzki, the headmaster and also a close friend of Ludwik.

In May 1933, an article in the weekly Prawda w Oczy stated that the city suffered great financial losses due to the delay of officials in delivering the Jachcice power plant: as a consequence, an investigation began. It quickly turned out that the newspaper completely missed the point; however, the affair cast a shroud of suspicion on Ludwik's position. As a consequence, he resigned on March 31, 1934.

=== Associative activities ===
As soon as Ludwik arrived in Bydgoszcz, he championed the creation of an organization representing interests of the displaced citizens from the Kresy: the Union of Poles from the Eastern Borderlands. In August 1921, he became a member of the Polish Intelligentsia Organization, at the cultural committee. In April 1922, he was a member of the Polish Club.

Ludwik was very impressed with Marie's knowledge and competence. At the time, it was even noticed by Henri Buzenac, the chancellor of the French consulate in Poznań. However, the break up of Ludwik first marriage was soon blamed upon Marie, who quickly lost the trust of many co-workers and friends, especially those coming from the eastern borderlands. For that reason, she had to resign at the end of 1924, from the direction of the French governmental course program and was replaced by Jadwiga Kalm-Podowska, the wife of Tytus Podoski, counselor of the Bydgoszcz magistrate and Ludwik's friend from his time in Kyiv.

Eventually, Marie Regamey's achievements were recognized by the French government, which awarded her in May 1927, with the Ordre des Palmes académiques.

In February 1924, the Alliance Francaise society was established in Bydgoszcz, and Ludwik became its first president. In addition to her private school, Maria additionally set up the Society of Friends of France in Bydgoszcz (Polish: Towarzystwo Przyjaciół Francji w Bydgoszczy) in which she was vice-president.

The Regamey couple worked closely with Les Amis de la Pologne, a French-based association, editing a monthly magazine. Its chief editor was Rosa Bailly born in Saint-Florent-sur-Cher, a scholar from Paris École normale supérieure. Mrs. Rosa, a great Polish lover, visited several times the Regameys in Bydgoszcz: the first occurrence happened in September 1926. For this occasion, a reception was held at the Pod Orłem hotel, followed by a musical performance with the singer Aurelia Klein-Mierzyńska accompanied by Ludwik Regamey on the piano. The visit included many places of Bydgoszcz, including the French soldiers grave corners from the 1870 German-French war in the Starofarny Cemetery. In March 1929, after another visit to Bydgoszcz the year prior, Les Amis de la Pologne described the newly built power plant, quoting Regamey's engagement to the project.

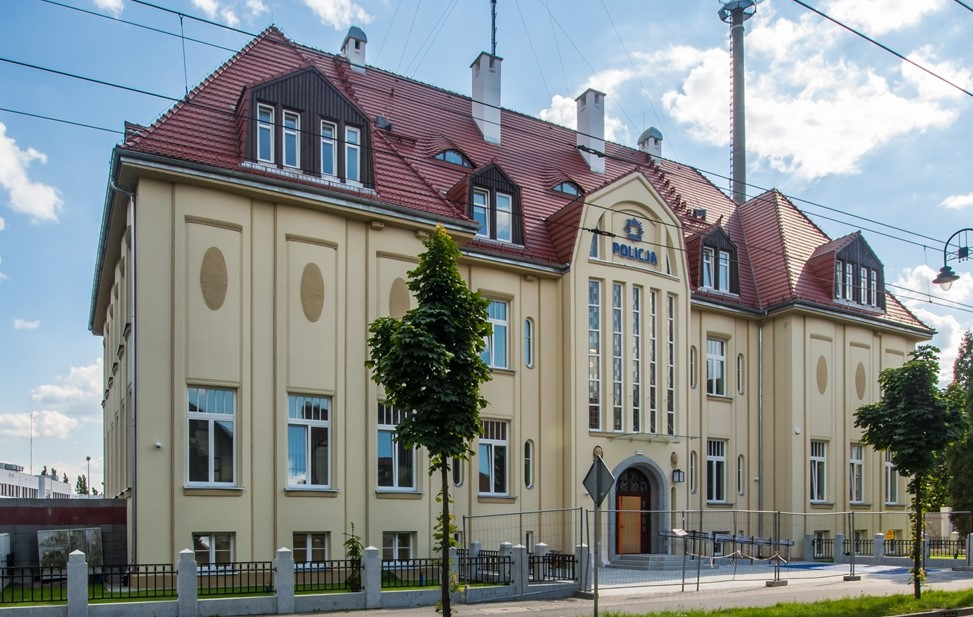
Building of then Borderland Internat

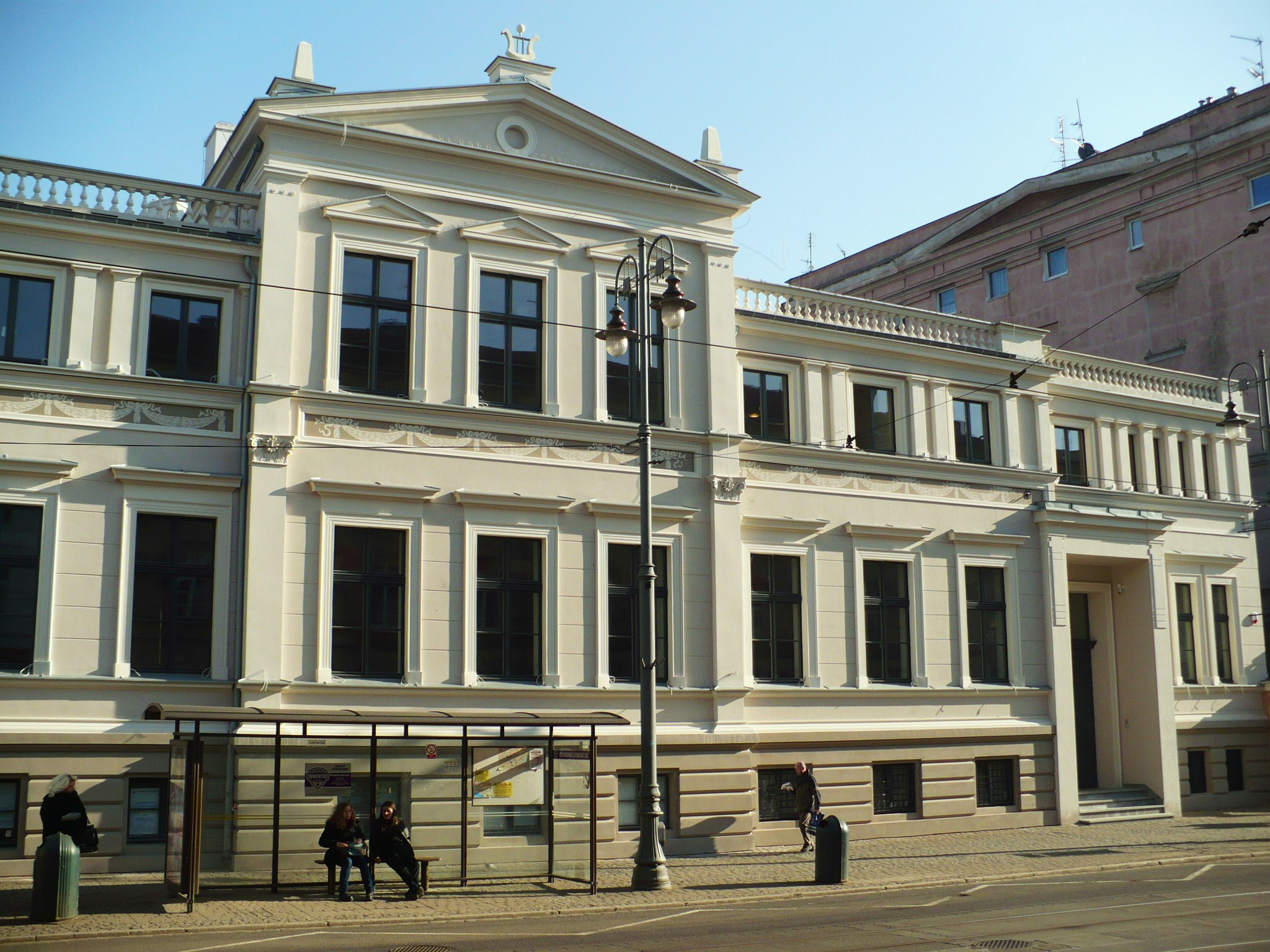
Ex-Civil Casino building

=== Music ===
Ldudwik Regamey had a solid musical education, since his childhood. In Bydgoszcz, he generally played the piano, but he also performed on the violin, guitar and cello. His favorite composers were Frédéric Chopin, Bach, Brahms, Mozart.

His artistic debut took place for a specific purpose: he appeared at a banquet of the Borderland Internat at 80 Senatorska street (currently 32 Chodkiewicza street), together with the dentist Idzi Świtała, in February 1921.

He then began to work earnestly for the creation of the Bydgoszcz Music Society, which happened on May 30, 1922: he chaired the chamber music section. The association celebrated Karol Szymanowski during a special ceremony on August 12, 1922; Ludwik knew his mother and relatives -living in Bydgoszcz- from his life in Kyiv. His nephew Constantin (the future famous composer) took part in the performance. The first official concert inaugurating the artistic society took place on 5 December, 1922, at the Civil Casino on Gdańska Street. The association welcomed many musical celebrities, like the violinist Wacław Kochański.

Besides, Ludwik made individual representations, often following lectures from Witold Bełza, then director of the Municipal Library, related to French music and culture. He performed in different premises of Bydgoszcz (School of Art Industry, Copernicanum, Gymnasium of Humanities), but also in nearby Toruń where he played with a larger orchestra in the Municipal Theatre. In November 1927, he organized a concert to commemorate the 20th anniversary of the death of Edvard Grieg. Similarly, he worked out a performance on May 12, 1928, on the occasion of the 40th artistic anniversary of Polish composer Stanisław Niewiadomski.

=== France ===
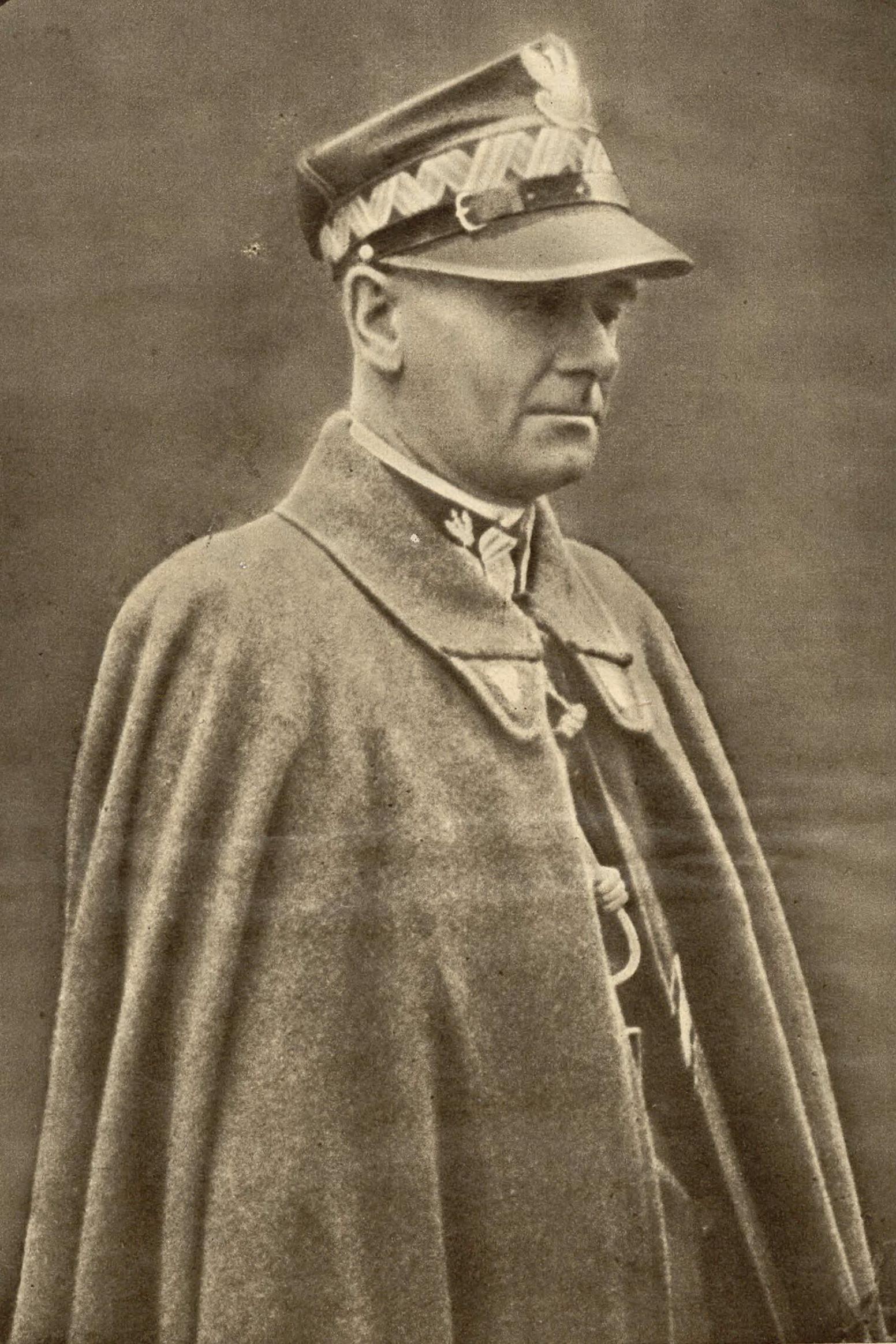
General Edward Rydz-Śmigły, 1936

After his resignation as city building counselor, Ludwik moved with his family to Paris in July 1934, at 16, rue Clapeyron in the 8th arrondissement. According to the agreement he had made with Bydgoszcz magistrate before departure, he regularly wrote back articles, describing his active life in Paris.

In France, he quickly joined the social life of Polish organizations. Henceforth he became in January 1936, the president of the Committee of Polish Societies in Paris, position which added to his other functions:

- vice-chairman of the Main Board of the Union of Poles in France;
- chairman of the Paris District of the Union of Poles;
- chairman of the Polish House in Paris;
- permanent delegate of Les Amis de la Pologne Society;
- chairman of the Honorary Court of the Society of former Military and Reservists of Paris and Argenteuil.

As a sign of his growing role in the Polish community, he welcomed in Paris in August 1936, general Edward Rydz-Śmigły then Commander-in-chief of Polish armed forces. He also worked closely with Polish ambassadors in the French capital, Alfred Chłapowski and Juliusz Łukasiewicz. In June 1937, he became the sponsor of the banner of the Polish Combatants association in Troyes, and in December 1938, he sponsored the banner of the Józef Piłsudski-Cultural and Educational Society in Aubervilliers.

In addition to this frantic social activity and his periodic articles for Bydgoszcz, Ludwik tried to provide as many materials as possible documenting his work in France. Furthermore, Maria and himself were translating Polish articles for French magazines such as L'Illustration, Benjamin, Benjamine or Les Amis de la Pologne.

On her side, Maria translated Polish works and studies into French, among others:

- Joseph Pilsudski en Sibérie by Mieczysław Lepecki;
- Mineurs de Pologne: des étoiles dans le puits and Six jours by Gustaw Morcinek.

They came back to visit Bydgoszcz several times before the outbreak of WWII. Ludwik's last article relating his French activities was sent out in June 1939.

The Regameys bought two houses in France, in Locmiquel-en-Baden, Brittany and in the Pyrenees mountains. They left Paris in June 1940, when German troops arrived and divided their time between Locmiquel and Toulouse. Their friend Rosa Bailly also stayed in this city during WWII, from where she steered Les Amis de la Pologne activity. Rosa organized as well a great aid campaign in Toulouse for Poles who had fled their occupied country.

After the war, Maria and Ludwik did not come back to Paris, mainly due to their dire financial situation. While Maria earned money from music lessons, their position gradually improved after the intervention of Regina, Ludwik's first daughter. As a matter of fact, Regina interceded at the beginning of the 1950s upon Polish authorities to have his pensions paid anew. The couple had still visits from their friends, among whom was Count Roman Wodzicki, the Polish consul in Toulouse.

During the first years of Polish People's Republic, nobody from the Regamey family came from Bydgoszcz. It's only in 1957, after the death of her mother Kazimierza, that Regina visited her father. Two years later, while visiting post-war Poland after WWII break, Rosa Bailly met Regina. In 1960, Tomasz, Regina's son, had the opportunity to meet his grandfather in Toulouse. After the death of his second wife Marie, Ludwik moved to a care home. He died on 8 February 1967, in Toulouse's Hopital de Purpan. He was buried in a Toulouse cemetery.

In June 2016, Tomasz Falkowski, Regamey's grandson, handed over to the Academy of Music in Bydgoszcz, recordings of his grandfather's works, including a brilliant performance of Constantin Regamey, Ludwik's nephew.

== Family ==
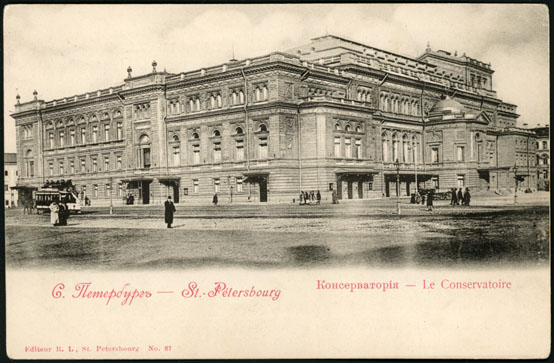
Saint Petersburg Conservatory, ca 1915

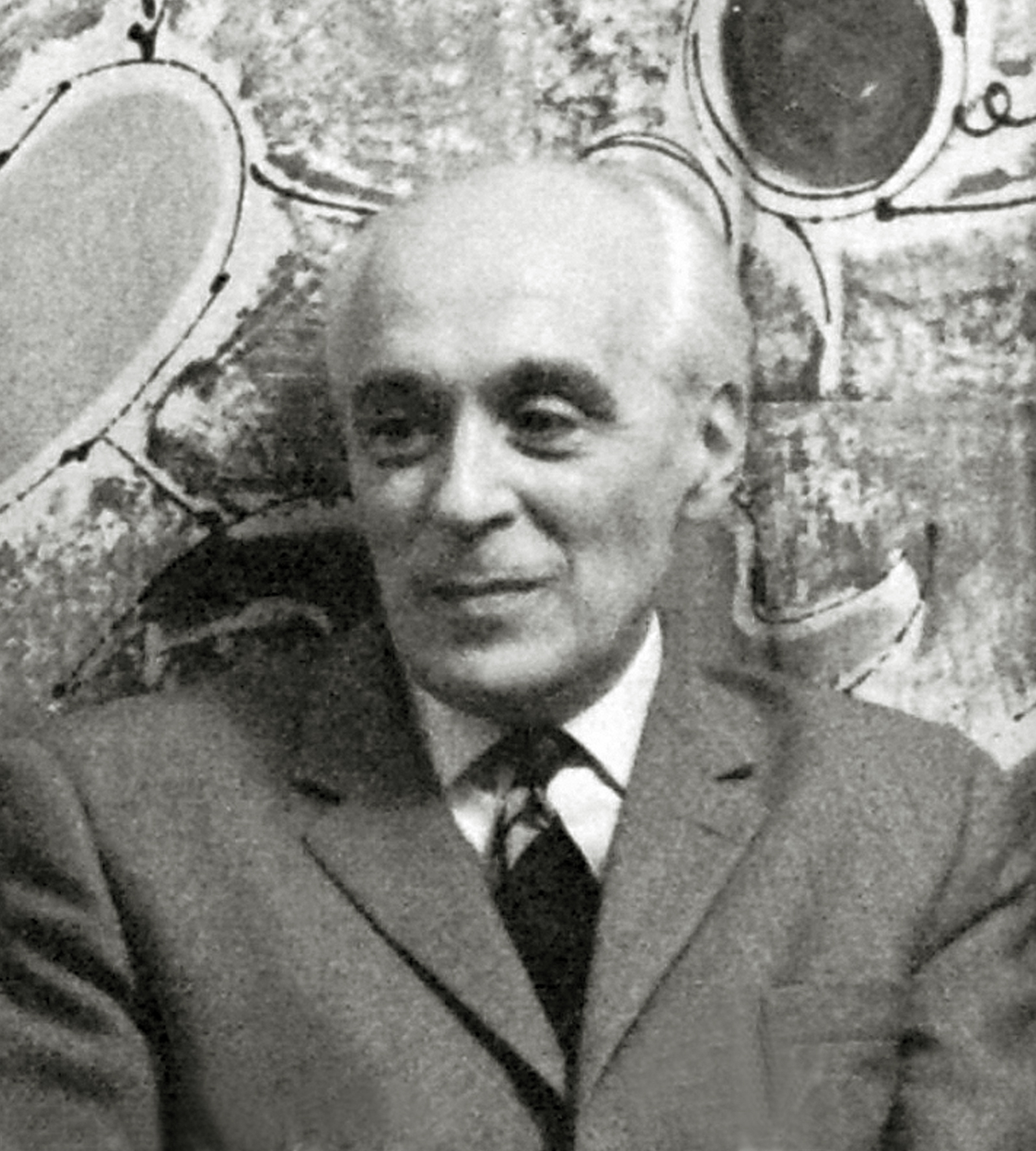
Constantin Régamey, Ludwik's nephew

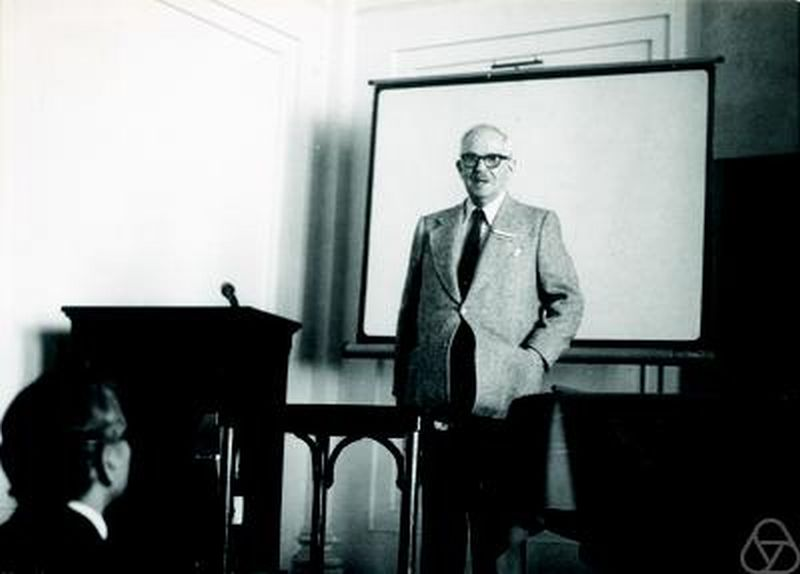
Jerzy Spława-Neyman, Ludwik's cousin

- Louis Regamey, French teacher, Vilnius
  - Casimir Ludwigovitch (1859-1907)
  - Rudolf Felix Gabriel Ludwigovitch (1852-1891) + Marianna, née Zeleney
    - Ludwik Regamey (1877-1967)
      - Rudolf (1905-1915) with Kazimiera née Lutosławski (1^{st} marriage)
      - Regina (1914-2010) with Kazimiera née Lutosławski (1^{st} marriage)
        - Ewa (born 1934) with Jerzy Morzycki (1^{st} marriage)
        - Tomasz with Edward Falkowski (2^{nd} marriage)
      - Maria Janina (1921-) with Marie Strowska (2^{nd} marriage)
    - Leon Regamey (-1944)
    - Helena Regamey (1883-1958) + Aleksander Dobrowolski h. Nałęcz (1881-1941)
      - Jan
      - Wanda
    - Konstanty Regamey (1879-)
      - Constantin (1907-1982) with Lidia Sławicz (1^{st} marriage)
      - Svietlana Konstantinovna Regamey with Natalia Alexandrovna (2^{nd} marriage)
- Kazimierza's (Ludwik's first wife) aunt, Kazimiera Spława-Neyman, née Lutosławski, had moved from the Eastern borderlands on the 1920s to Bydgoszcz, with her children, Ludwik's cousins, by an evacuation train. Among them, Jerzy (1894-1981) found a job at the Institutes of Agriculture of Bydgoszcz before resuming his studies at the University of Warsaw in 1924. He eventually became an internationally distinguished Polish mathematician and statistician.
- Regina, Ludwik's first daughter, passed brilliantly her secondary school at the Municipal Girls' Gymnasium in Bydgoszcz, at the age of sixteen. In September 1933, Regina married Jerzy Morzycki in the Church of St. Michał in Warsaw. Regina was then a student at the university and Dr. Jerzy Morzycki was a Polish bacteriologist-epidemiologist at the National institute for hygiene. Jerzy Morzycki was the brother of Irena Iłłakowicz. Regina had a daughter with him, Ewa (born 1934), before their divorce. From her second marriage with Edward Falkowski, she had a son, Tomasz. Regina Regamey died in 2010.

Ludwik's siblings comprised two brothers -Leon and Konstanty- and one sister, Helena. They all received a thorough musical education:

- Leon, Ludwik's first brother, moved to Tarnopol, where he taught mathematics and physics at the 3^{rd} Male Gymnasium. Occasionally he contacted his family scattered around Poland. He died in 1944.
- Helena Regamey (1883-1958) married Aleksander Dobrowolski h. Nałęcz (1881-1941). They had two children, Jan and Wanda. They moved to Switzerland after WWII, closing the family journey that her great grandfather started when he left the country in the end of the 19th century.
- Ludwik's younger brother, Konstanty, was born on June 23, 1879. He graduated from the Saint Petersburg Conservatory, where he received lessons from Reinhold Glière, who also taught to young Sergei Prokofiev. He met his future wife Lidia Sławicz at the conservatoire: she was a liberal arts student. Together, they founded the first music school in Kyiv. Konstantin soon became a composer à la mode in the Ukrainian city. The turmoils brought in 1917, by the Russian Revolution and the subsequent Ukrainian War of Independence decided him to leave to Taganrog on the coast of the Sea of Azov. Between 1919 and 1922, Konstanty worked there as a music teacher in the provincial conservatory. At the same time (1917), his wife Lydia fled Kyiv to Warsaw with their son Constantin, establishing permanently their rupture. Once back to Kyiv in 1922, Konstanty set up alone another -state approved- music school. In the end, the school merged with the renowned Lysenko music school, where he was a piano teacher. He married his second wife Natalia Alexandrovna, from Zhmerynka, who was one of his student, 22 years younger than him. They had a daughter Svietlana Konstantinovna Regamey, who moved in 1943 to Moscow. In 1928, the Communist Party of Ukraine exposed the entire personnel of the institution as progressist: although many of his colleagues were fired and jailed, Konstanty was not attacked. The institute was closed by political decree in 1934, creating in its stead two distinct schools, a Theatre Institute and a Conservatoire, where Konstanty kept his piano teaching position. He used to accompany some famous singers from his time, such as Mikhail Bocharov, Mykoła Nikołajevitch Filimonow or Dmitri Rewucki. From 1927 to 1932, he took part to concerts directed by Levko Revutsky and broadcast by Kiev national radio channel. In July 1936, Konstanty is ordered by the authorities to set up a Polish Folk group. However, the NKVD started simultaneously to arrest members of this ensemble, ending with Konstanty on July 1, 1937. He was sentenced to death by Moscow on January 12, 1938, and executed 8 days later in a Kyiv prison. Eventually his daughter Svietlana asked for and obtained her father's rehabilitation.
  - Konstanty's son from his first marriage, Constantin (1907-1982) -Ludwik's nephew- became a famous philologist, orientalist, pianist, composer and critic. He worked in the artistic circles in Warsaw in the 1930s, fought with the Polish underground resistance under the pseudonym Czesław Drogowski and left Warsaw during the uprising in October 1944, to Lausanne, Switzerland, where he taught at the university.

== Works ==
=== As an engineer ===
Ludwik Regamey initiated and managed the construction of the power plant in Jachcice in the late 1920s. The district of Jachcice was at the time a rural area in the north-west part of the city, additionally located near the main train station, ideal for the erection of such a facility.

The plant has been supplying the municipal district heating network with hot water for more than 90 years.

=== As a musician ===
Ludwik Regamey's musical plays included performances and accompaniments.

He accompanied among others:

- Julia Gorzechowska's recital in 1923 and 1927;
- Wacław Kochański's violin performance in 1923;
- a concert devoted to French music in 1924;
- Witold Bełza's lectures about Frédéric Chopin and French culture and music from 1922.

He performed (as soloist or as member of an orchestra), in particular:

- during a special ceremony to Karol Szymanowski on August 12, 1922;
- at the inauguration of Bydgoszcz Music Society on December 5, 1922. The program comprised the Piano Quartet in D minor, Op. 8 by Zygmunt Noskowski;
- as head of the chamber section of the Bydgoszcz Music Society;
- the Piano Quartets by Beethoven and the Piano Quintet by Brahms on February 21, 1926;
- a Piano trio by Wolfgang Amadeus Mozart on March 14, 1926;
- a Sonata for violin and piano by Beethoven and a Piano trio by Felix Mendelssohn on April 11, 1926;
- the Piano Concerto by Grieg on November 30, 1927;
- during the concert on the occasion of the 40th anniversary of Stanisław Niewiadomski's career on May 12, 1928.

== Gallery ==
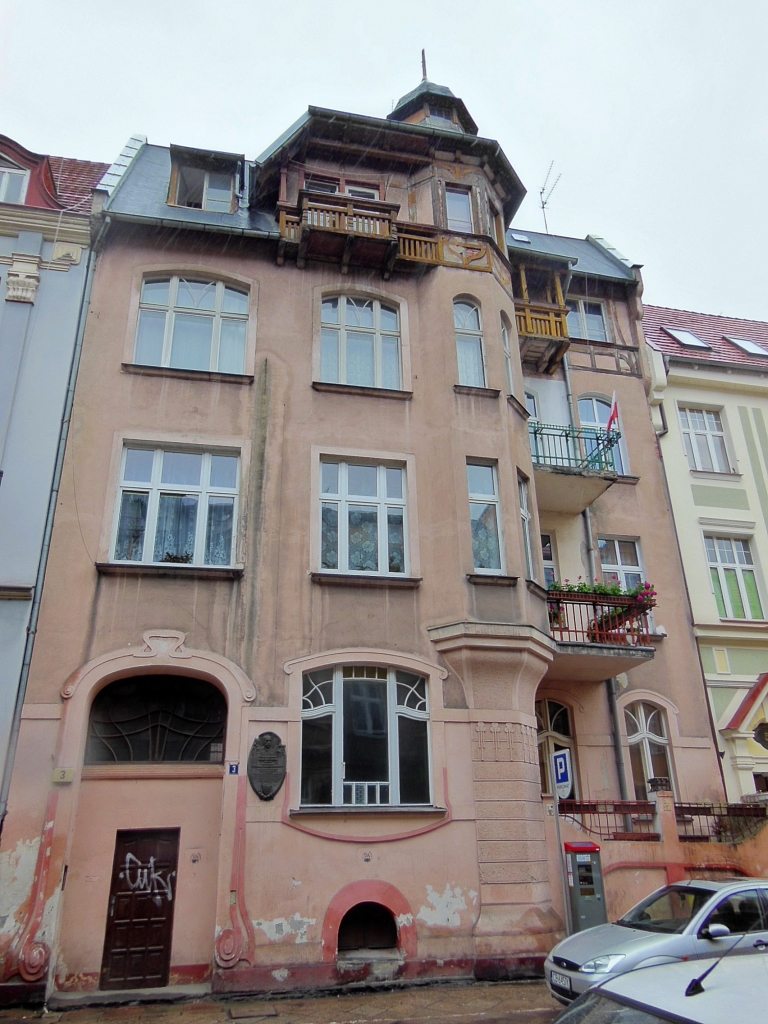
Tenement at 3 August Cieszkowski Street where Ludwik and Maria lived from 1924 to 1934.

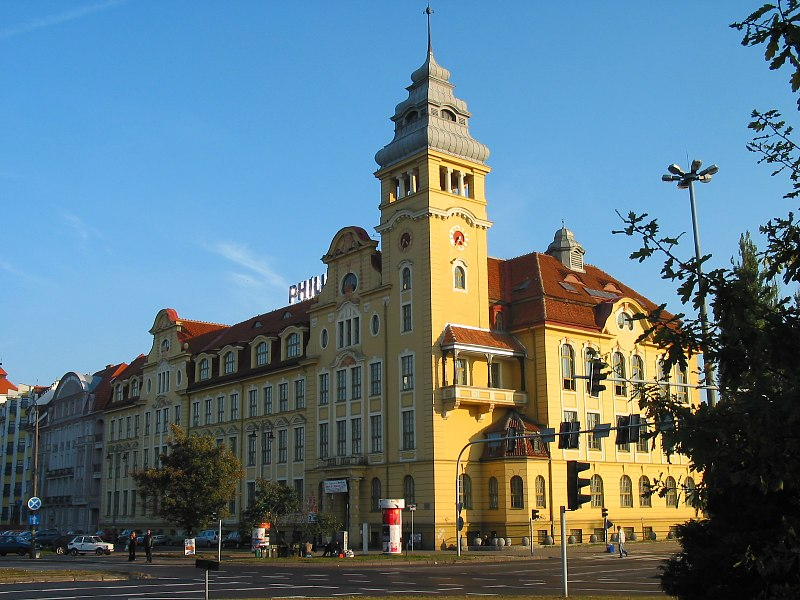
State Industrial School, where Maria's French institute hold its end-of-school celebrations.

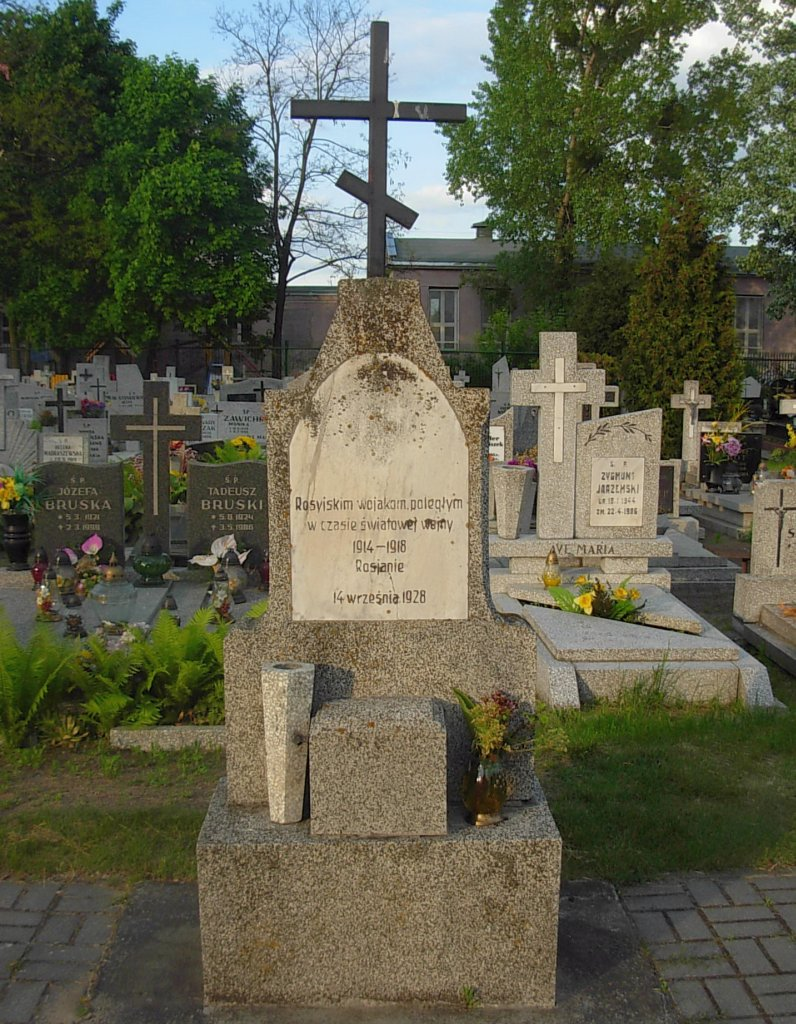
Monument to the Russian soldiers who died during World War I, unveiled in 1928 in Bydgoszcz cemetery by Ludwik Regamey (inter alia).

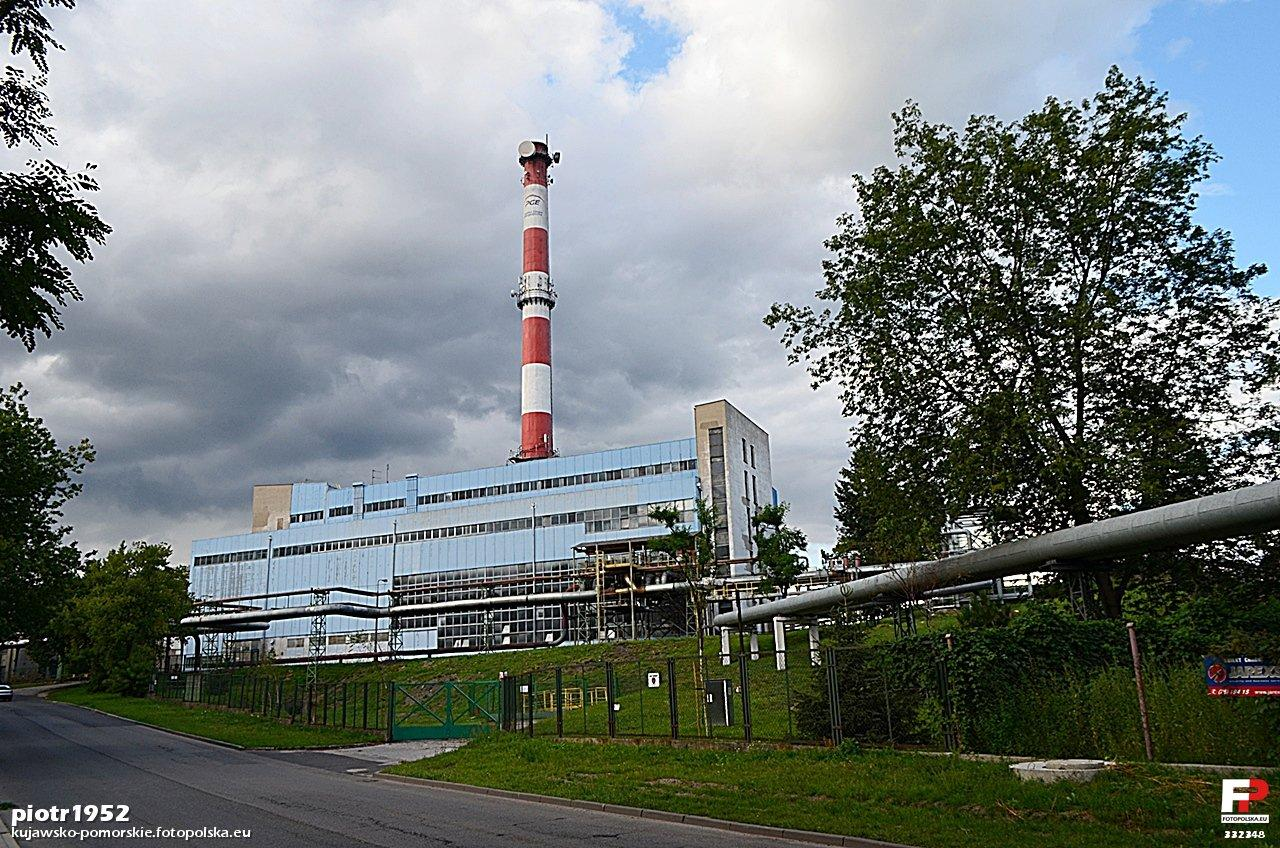
The Jachcice power plant today

== See also ==
- Bydgoszcz
- Rosa Bailly
- Fortunat Strowski
- Constantin Regamey
- Jerzy Neyman
- List of Polish people

== Bibliography ==
- (in Polish) Chmielewska, Gizela (2015). Ludwik Regamey (1877-1967) radca budowlany z duszą artysty. Kronika Bydgoska XXXVI. Bydgoszcz: Towarzystwo Miłosnikow Miasta Bydgoszczy - Bydgoskie Towarzystwo Naukowe. pp. 83–106. ISBN 83-87419-76-1.
