= Witold Bełza =

Polish librarian (1886–1955)

- Witold Stanisław Kazimierz Bełza
- Born: 8 May 1886; Warsaw, Russian Empire
- Died: 24 February 1955 (aged 68); Bydgoszcz, Poland
- Resting place: Nowofarny Cemetery, Bydgoszcz
- Occupations: Librarian, writer, publicist
- Awards

Witold Stanisław Kazimierz Bełza (1886–1955) was a Polish librarian, writer, publicist and cultural activist. He was the director of the Provincial and Municipal Public Library of Bydgoszcz from 1920 to 1939 and from 1945 to 1952.

== Biography ==
=== Youth and First World War ===
Witold Bełza was born on 8 May 1886, in Warsaw. His father, Stanisław Bełza (1849–1929), was a Silesian lawyer and journalist and his mother, Jadwiga née Kobylańska, the daughter of a Warsaw doctor. Stanisław and Jadwiga had also two daughters, Janina and Helenas. Witold, in his early years, was impressed by the strong patriotic feelings of his father and his travels, his social activities: he even attended a rally organized by Stanisław in Opole while aged 7.

Witold attended a gymnasium in Warsaw. At that time, the social unrest in the Polish capital against russification in the education and the social life under Russian rule stirred strikes in schools, preventing Witold from finishing his junior high school. He had to leave to join the prestigious Jesuit School in Chyrów (today's Khyriv, Ukraine) where in 1905, he passed his end of secondary school examination. In 1910, he started to work in the library of the National Ossoliński Institute in Lviv: he left the position only in 1920. Between 1911 and 1914, he studied at the Faculty of Humanities of Lviv University. During his stay in the Ukrainian capital, he was engaged in journalistic and literary works: among others, he was the editor of "Poradnika Teatrów i Chórów Włościańskich" and a collaborator of "Pamiętnik Literacki" (Literary Diary).

Bełza was traveling in Switzerland when World War I broke out. He opted to stay in the country and took a job as a librarian in the Polish Museum in Rapperswil. In January 1917, he was able to move back to the Ossolineum of Lwów. There, under the supervision of professor Wilhelm Bruchnalski, Witold wrote his thesis entitled "Wernyhora in Słowacki's poetry", for which he obtained his Doctor of Philosophy from the University of Lviv. During the graduating ceremony, the poet Jan Kasprowicz himself handed out the Ph.D to Bełza. Until 1920, he worked at the Ossolineum in Lviv, at the time led by Wojciech Kętrzyński and Ludwik Bernacki.

=== Life in Bydgoszcz ===
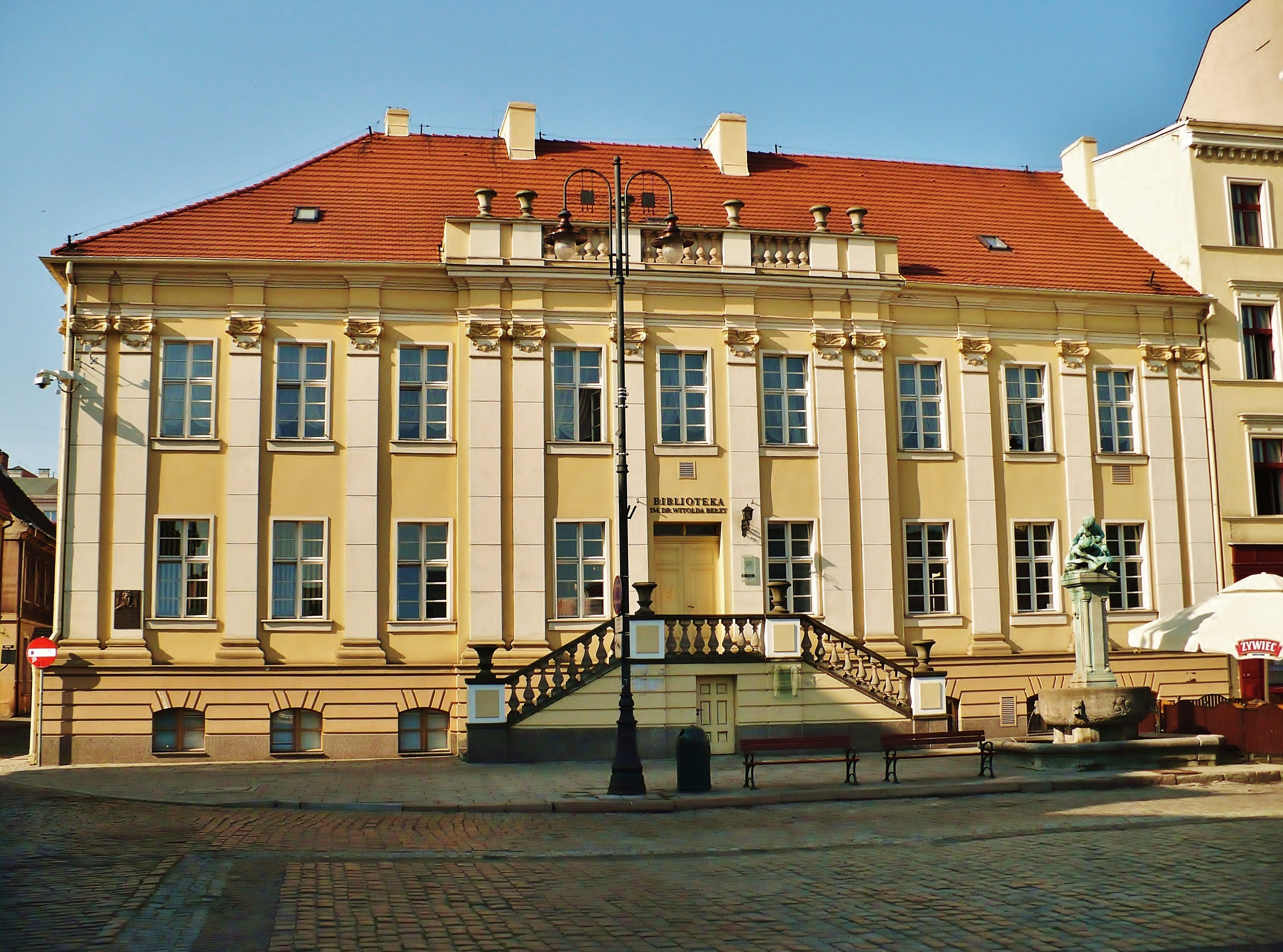
Building of the Municipal Library

==== Head of the Municipal Library ====
In August 1920, aged 34, Witold Bełza settled in Bydgoszcz, as a winner of a contest for the library direction launched by the local authorities. He lived downtown at 6 20 Stycznia 1920 Street, apartment 3. On 1 September, he sat at the position of director of the Municipal and People's Library. There, he took care of the comprehensive Polonization of the institution. Within a few years, he transformed the German book collection into a valuable Polish one. He expanded the manuscript department and recovered from German hands the remains of the Bernardine Library.

Bełza received numerous donations and deposits for the library and educated many librarians. Among the donators there were writers, scientists, artists, among others: painters Franciszek Teodor Ejsmond and Jerzy Mieczysław Rupniewski, Konstanty Laszczka, scholar Rudolf Mękicki, Feliks Nowowiejski, Stanisław Łempicki, Marian Turwid and Kornel Makuszyński. The director of the library even donated manuscripts he owned from authors like Józef Kallenbach, Aleksander Brückner or from his father's or uncle's works. He converted the institution into a significant research center. Noticeable donator includes Kazimierz Kierski, then president of the General Prosecutor's Office in Poznań, who handed over a collection of almost 2700 documents (privileges, diplomas, nomination letters, etc.) with 13 parchments and more than 500 letters and royal documents. Unfortunately, Kierski's collection was lost during WWII and German occupation. Another important contributor was Adam Grzymała-Siedlecki, who donated a dozen of books from Vladimir Lenin's Poronin collection, from the period when the soviet leader-to-be used to stay in the Polish Tatra (1913–1914). In 1945, the City Council handed it over back to the Soviet Union as a gift from the Polish People's Republic. From the 75,000 volumes (almost exclusively in German) in 1920, Bełza increased the collection of the library to more than 136 000 volumes in 1939, and up to 231 000 volumes in 1952.

In addition to the library director position, Witold kept working on scientific and literary topics: he published studies in the field of library science, history of Polish literature and theater criticism. He was also the author of several works of fiction and translations of German and French books, from authors such as Franz Werfel, Bruno Traven or Henri-Robert.

From 1935 to 1936, he started to collaborate regularly to the Polish Biographical Dictionary, preparing several biographies. Similarly, he wrote correspondence and columns for local and national press. Many of his literary work manuscripts were lost during the German occupation, notably a 600-page writing entitled "Ksawera Deibel" based on authentic letters from Adam Mickiewicz to Xawera (1818–1900), a Polish singer, Chopin's student and Mickiewicz's long-time lover. From 1934 to 1939, he fulfilled an additional duty as head of the Department of Education and Culture of the Municipal Board.

==== Cultural activist ====
As an early lover of music and singing, Bełza regularly attended premieres at the City Theater. He also, thanks to his position, often joined music events. He often played piano during social gatherings and was active in the chamber music section from the Bydgoszcz Music Society, created in 1922 by Ludwik Regamey. He was a member of the Society board and eventually became its vice president. In the 1920s, Witold performed a series of lectures related to French music and culture, which included Ludwik Regamey's musical performances.

Bełza was active in other socio-cultural organizations:

- the Polish Intelligentsia Organization (from 1921), disseminating Polish literature and the History of Poland;
- the Society of the Lovers of the City of Bydgoszcz (Polish: Towarzystwo Miłośników Miasta Bydgoszczy), which he co-created in 1923. Bernard Śliwiński, then mayor of Bydgoszcz, was its first president till 1925;
- the Regional Museum in Bydgoszcz, as one of the initiators of the establishment;
- the Artistic and Cultural Council in Bydgoszczz (Polish: Rada Artystyczno-Kulturalna w Bydgoszczy) (1934–1939).

With his hectic activity, he significantly contributed to the growth of Bydgoszcz as a cultural center in Pomorskie Voivodeship and in the country. In 1933, thanks to the efforts of Zygmunt Malewski, an employee of the Municipal Archives, Witold Bełza launched the first issue of "Przegląd Bydgoski" (Bydgoszcz Review), a scientific journal devoted to the history of the city, to religious and secular art, and literature.

==== World War II and final years ====
Witold Bełza spent the war time outside of Bydgoszcz. He first stayed a few months in Briukhovychi near Lviv as a teacher, then he moved to Lviv, where he was running and organizing the library at the Children's Clinic. In 1944, when a bomb destroyed the house they lived in, Bełza and his family moved to Ciężkowice near Tarnów, staying there during the last months of the war. He returned to Bydgoszcz on 14 March 1945, and was once again entrusted with the management of the Municipal Library.

In the post-war years, he combined other posts:

- head of the Municipal Department of Culture and Art (September 1945 – February 1949);
- literary director of the Municipal Theater (1946–1947);
- lecturer at the Bydgoszcz Drama School (1947).

After 1946, under his leadership, a network of Public Libraries was being developed within the city.

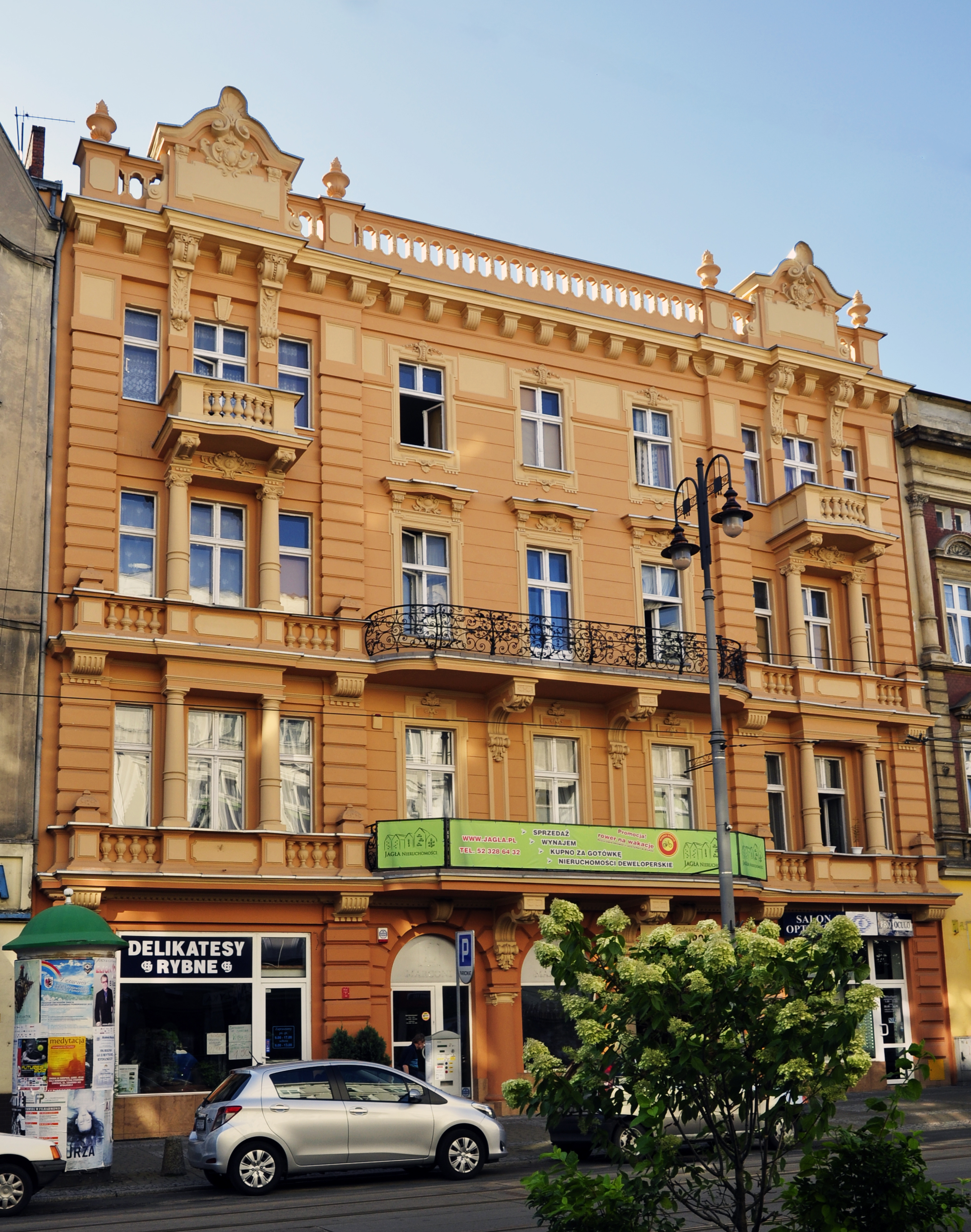
Tenement at 33 Gdańska street

On 28 August 1945, the city authorities assigned Bełza to organize the jubilee celebration of the 600th anniversary of Bydgoszcz. His other activities in this period include:

- the set up of a Medical Library branch in the City library (December 1947), as a result of his experience in Lviv during the war;
- active membership of multiple Literary Societies (A. Mickiewicz association, Association of Polish Librarians, Polish Writers' Union);
- publishing in several periodicals between 1945 and 1949 ("Ilustrowany Kurier Polski", "Trybuna Pomorska", "Ziemia Pomorskie", "Tygodnik Warszawski").

The end of the 1940s marked the beginning of his parting from the new city authorities, for political reasons. Although Bełza joined the United People's Party and participated in the ideological training, he was no more conveniently considered by the ruling organs. As a consequence, in April 1951, he had to leave his apartment at 7 Asnyka street, which was soon put at the disposal of the Provincial Public Security Office. As a result, he moved to live in a flat at 33 Gdańska street. His fall was pushed down further as on 1 December 1952, he was removed from the position of Library director and deprived of the associated allowance. Finally, on 31 December of that year he was put to retirement. For some time, Witold worked in the Municipal Library as an assistant, but he eventually left for good the institution on 31 August 1953.

State authorities prevented him to resume any further professional activity, like at the Jagiellonian Library in Kraków or at the City Print House ("Państwowe Zakłady Wydawnictw Szkolnych" or PZWS). Witold Bełza died on 24 February 1955 in Bydgoszcz. He was buried in Bydgoszcz Nowofarny Cemetery. After his death, not a single official obituary was released.

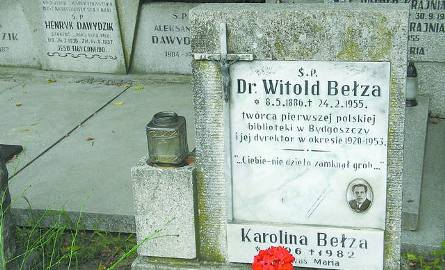
Witold Bełza's tombstone

=== Personal life and family ===
On 21 April 1917, Witold married Karolina Ludwika née Winiarz; Jan Kasprowicz was one of his witnesses. Karolina originated from a family of distinguished booksellers and printers of Lviv. They had a daughter, Halina (1919–1992), who married Jan Harasymowicz, a Polish professor of technical sciences from the Tadeusz Kościuszko University of Technology in Kraków, and a son Stanisław Janusz (1921–1982), lawyer and court expert. Janusz' daughter, Anna Dzierżykraj-Lipowicz, has been instrumental to keep the memory of her grandfather alive, collecting and sharing family mementoes and other details of his life.

Witold's father Stanisław was a lawyer, writer and an independence activist. He traveled across Europe, Asia and Africa. He published his impressions of his journeys in the form of small brochures which he gave to libraries, e.g. "Holandia" (1890), "W kraju tysiąca jezior" (In the country of a thousand lakes (1896), "Obrazy i obrazki z Indii" (Images and Pictures from India) (1912) or "Echa Szwajcarii" (The echoes of Switzerland) (1927). He often addressed topics related to Polish Silesia in his writings and social activities, especially at the time of the Upper Silesia plebiscite in 1921. Stanisław was a member of the Poznań Society for the Advancement of Arts and Sciences. He was at the initiative of the creation of the municipal library in Chorzów, Silesia, in 1922.

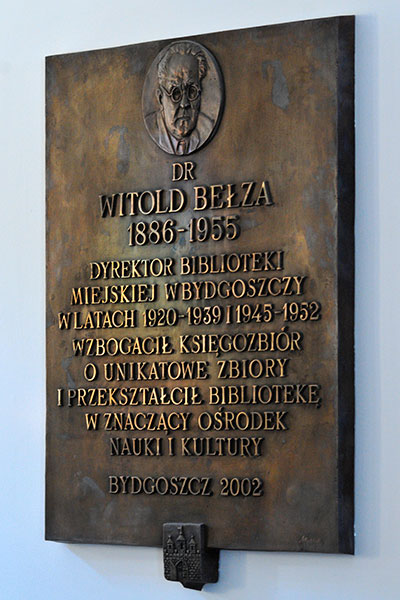
Commemorative plaque to Witold Bełza, by Michał Kubiak

Witold's uncle, Władysław Bełza (1847–1913), was also a writer, journalist and administrative secretary of the National Ossoliński Institute in Lviv. Like his brother Stanisław, he was a social activist and a correspondent member of the Poznań Society for the Advancement of Arts and Sciences.

Witold's grandfather, Józef Bełza (1805–1888), was a Polish chemist, pioneer of the sugar industry in Poland.

== Decorations ==
- Golden Cross of Merit

== Commemorations ==
Witold's son donated his father's diary to the University of Bydgoszcz. The book was bought by Witold's father in 1910. Inside, one can discover articles, watercolours, sketches, thoughts of the librarian, but also mementoes from famous scholars he met: lines from Teofil Lenartowicz, Aleksander Brückner or Stanisław Przybyszewski, a photo of William Morfill while in Oxford in 1909, a sketch by Konstanty Laszczka, fragments of music scores by Feliks Nowowiejski, Ludomir Różycki, words of appreciation from Adam Grzymała-Siedlecki, a sketch of a poem by Józef Weyssenhoff.

On 24 February 1984, thanks to the efforts of his daughter Halina, a commemorative plaque was unveiled on the wall at 33 Gdańska Street. The bronze work by Michał Kubiak recalls Witold's last living place in the city.

Since 2002, the Provincial and Municipal Public Library has been renamed Witold Bełza in his honor.

In 2017, the namesake of Witold Bełza has been assigned by plebiscite of Bydgoszcz inhabitants to one of the 18 new tramways purchased by the city.

== See also ==
- Bydgoszcz
- List of Polish people

== Bibliography ==
- (in Polish) Chlewicka, Aldona (2001). Witold Bełza (1886–1955). Życie i działalność . Kronika Bydgoska XXIII. Bydgoszcz: Towarzystwo Miłosnikow Miasta Bydgoszczy - Bydgoskie Towarzystwo Naukowe. pp. 285–301.
- (in Polish) Błażejewski Stanisław, Kutta Janusz, Romaniuk Marek (1995). Bydgoski Słownik Biograficzny. Tom II. Bydgoszcz: Kujawsko-Pomorskie Towarzystwo Kulturalne. pp. 28–31. ISBN 8385327274.
- (in Polish) Pruss Zdzisław, Weber Alicja, Kuczma Rajmund (2004). Bydgoski leksykon muzyczny. Bydgoszcz: Kujawsko-Pomorskie Towarzystwo Kulturalne. p. 51. ISBN 8385327274.
