= Rosa Bailly =

French journalist and poet (1890–1976)

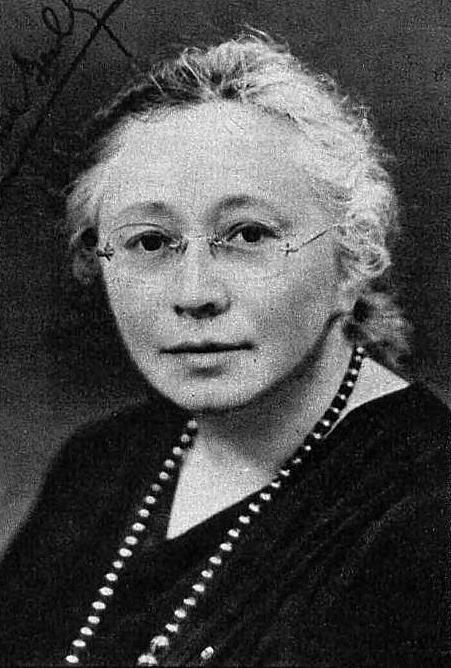
- Rosa Bailly before 1939
- Born: Rosa Bailly; 14 March 1890; Saint-Florent-sur-Cher, France
- Died: 14 June 1976 (aged 86); Pau, France
- Other names: Rosa Dufour-Bailly, Aimée Dufour
- Occupations: teacher, writer, poet, translator, social activist
- Years active: 1914-1976
- Known for: supporting Polish national independence and culture
- Notable work: Histoire de l'amitié franco-polonaise – A History of Franco-Polish friendship

Rosa Bailly (14 March 1890 – 14 June 1976), known also as Rosa Dufour-Bailly and Aimée Dufour was a French teacher, journalist and writer closely tied throughout her professional life to the cause of Poland and its literature. She was also a poet.

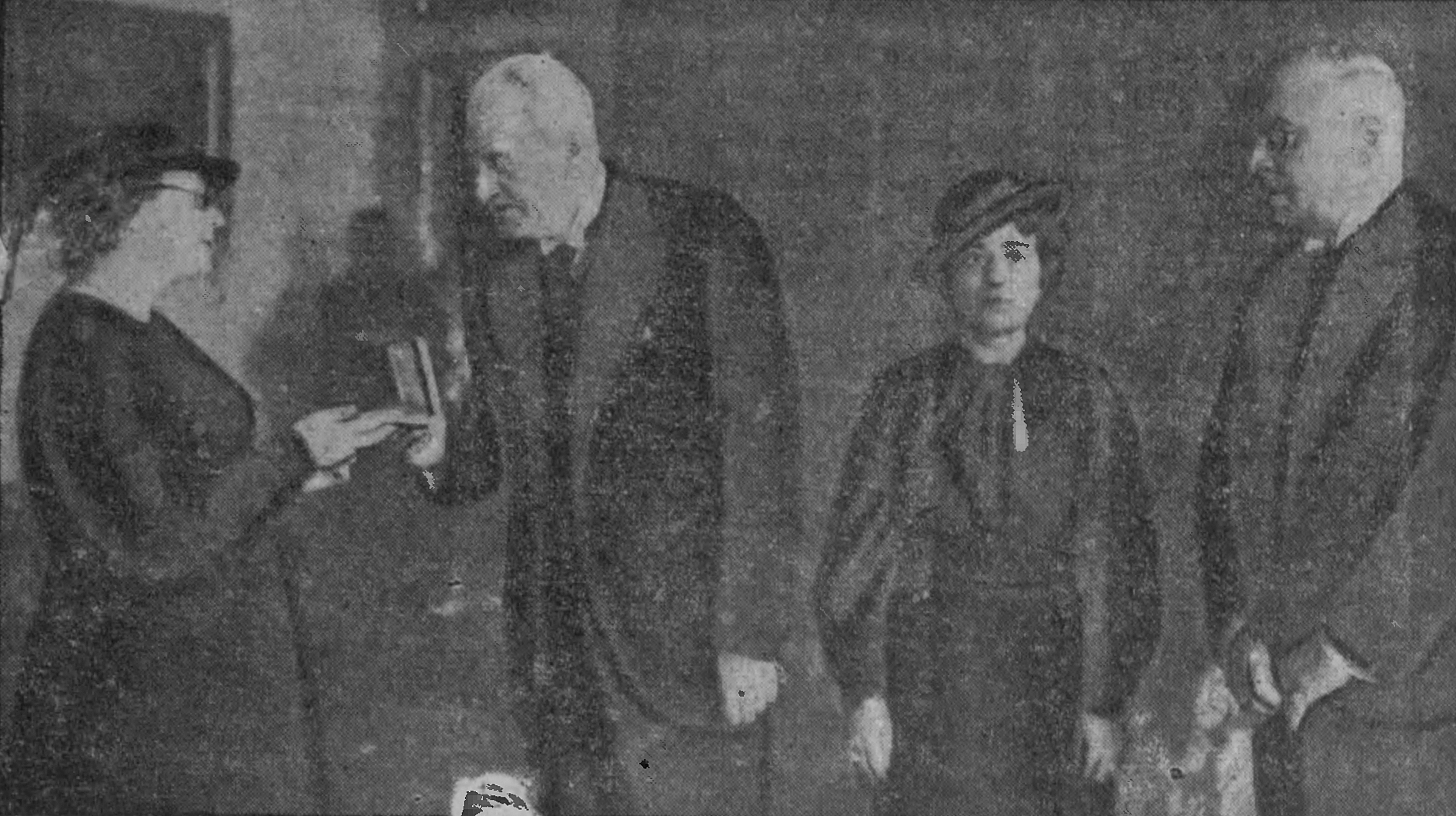

== Biography ==
Bailly was born in Saint-Florent-sur-Cher in a modest family of farmers and artisans. She completed her education at the École Normale Supérieure de Sèvres. Although initially trained for a career in teaching, she was deeply influenced by early history lessons on the Partitions of Poland, which left a lasting impression on her. Later, she was to tell her colleagues:

"Apprenez à vos éléves que le démembrement de la Pologne en 1772 a sauvé la France, dites leurs que maintes fois le sang polonais à coulé à flot pour notre salut. Montrez leur la beauté de cette race intelligente, artiste et généreuse, son patriotisme et sa vitalité, son grand rôle historique …" – 'Teach your pupils that the dismemberment of Poland in 1772 saved France, tell them that Polish blood flowed many times to save us. Show them the beauty of that intelligent and artistic nation, its patriotism and its vitality, its great role in history ...'

She became a leading light of an association she founded in Paris, in 1919 under the name of Les Amis de la Pologne – The Friends of Poland, whose general secretary she was for many years. In 1921 she became an activist in the matter of a plebiscite about Upper Silesia joining the rest of a newly independent Second Polish Republic. She both translated into French and had published the works of many Polish writers, among them, Maria Konopnicka, Julian Tuwim, Leopold Staff, Zofia Nałkowska, Kazimierz Przerwa-Tetmajer, Zenon Przesmycki, Wacław Berent and Boleslaw Leśmian.

During World War II, Rosa Bailly organised assistance for Polish prisoners of war and soldiers in France. She continued her Polish contacts after the war and well into retirement, but the intensity and the welcome had waned with the advent of Polish communism. She visited there one last time in 1959 and wrote a history of Warsaw. She was also a great lover of the Pyrenees and finally settled in that region. She died in Pau in 1976, aged 86.

A Rosa Bailly Exhibition was organized at the Bibliothèque municipale in Pau (where she spent the last years of her life) in 1990.

== Bibliography ==
Selected works by Rosa Bailly connected to Poland:

- 1926, 1928, 1939 : Histoire de l'amitié franco-polonaise – A History of Franco-Polish friendship
- 1924 : La Pologne renaît – The rebirth of Poland
- 1926 (?) : Comment se renseigner sur la Pologne, Union française des amis de la Pologne – How to find out about Poland, French Union of the friends of Poland
- 1930 : L'Hommage de la France à Mickiewicz – France's hommage to Mickiewicz
- 1928, 1938 : Petite histoire de la Pologne – A short history of Poland
- 1920–1930 : Villes de Pologne – Cities of Poland
- 1920 : Vilno, ville polonaise – Wilno, a Polish city
- 1924 : À la gloire de Léopol – The glory of Lwów
- 1927 : Une Ville polonaise : Bydgoszcz – Bydgoszcz, a Polish city
- 1928 : Guide de Pologne : Poznań, Varsovie, Wilno, Cracovie, Léopol, Zakopane – A guide to Poland: Poznań, Warsaw, Wilnius, Kraków, Lwów, Zakopane
- 1936 : Au cœur de la Pologne : Petites villes, châteaux, campagnes – The heart of Poland: small towns, stately homes, countryside.
- 1940 : Lettres aux Polonais en France – Letters to Poles in France
- 1949 : Varsoviennes (traduction de Kobiety de Stanisława Kuszelewska) – Women of Warsaw (translation of a work in Polish by Stanislawa Kuszelewska)
- 1956 : A City Fights for Freedom: The Rising of Lwów in 1918-1919 - translated from the French by Samuel S. B. Taylor

== Works about the author ==
- Mieczysława Wazdrag-Parisot, Rosa Bailly et la Pologne, Université de Paris-Sorbonne, 1980
- Anita Plytarz, "Rosa Bailly, sa vie et ses liens d'amitié tissés avec la Pologne" in Synergies Pologne, revue du Gerflint, Cracovie, 2006
- Tadeusz Edward Domański, Rosa Bailly : Wielka Francuzka o polskim sercu, Lublin, Norbertinum, 2003
- Małgorzata Nossowska, O Francuzce, która pokochała Polskę. Rosa Bailly i stowarzyszenie "Les Amis de la Pologne", Lublin, University of Maria Curie-Skłodowska, 2012, ISBN 978-83-7784-092-4 – About the French woman who fell in love with Poland. Rosa Bailly and the association, Friends of Poland.

Portraits of her are by Nina Alexandrowicz, Zbigniew Więckowski ( in oil) and Maja Berezowska (water colour). The sculptor Francis Black has made a bust of her, which is in the Bibliothèque polonaise de Paris see"cracovia-leopolis" .

== Awards and Distinctions ==
- 1936 : Commander of the Order of Polonia Restituta
- 1937 : Prix de l'Académie française – prix Kornmann (1 000F)
- Laures académiques of the Polish Academy of Literature
- 1969 : Prize of the Polish PEN Club
- 1969 : Francis Jammes prize

== See also ==
- Literary Association of the Friends of Poland
- Hotel Lambert
- France - Poland relations
- Franco-Polish alliance (1921)
- Poles in France
