= Voivodeship and Municipal Public Library, Bydgoszcz =

Voivodeship and Municipal Public Library in Bydgoszcz
- Polish: Wojewódzka i Miejska Biblioteka Publiczna w Bydgoszczy
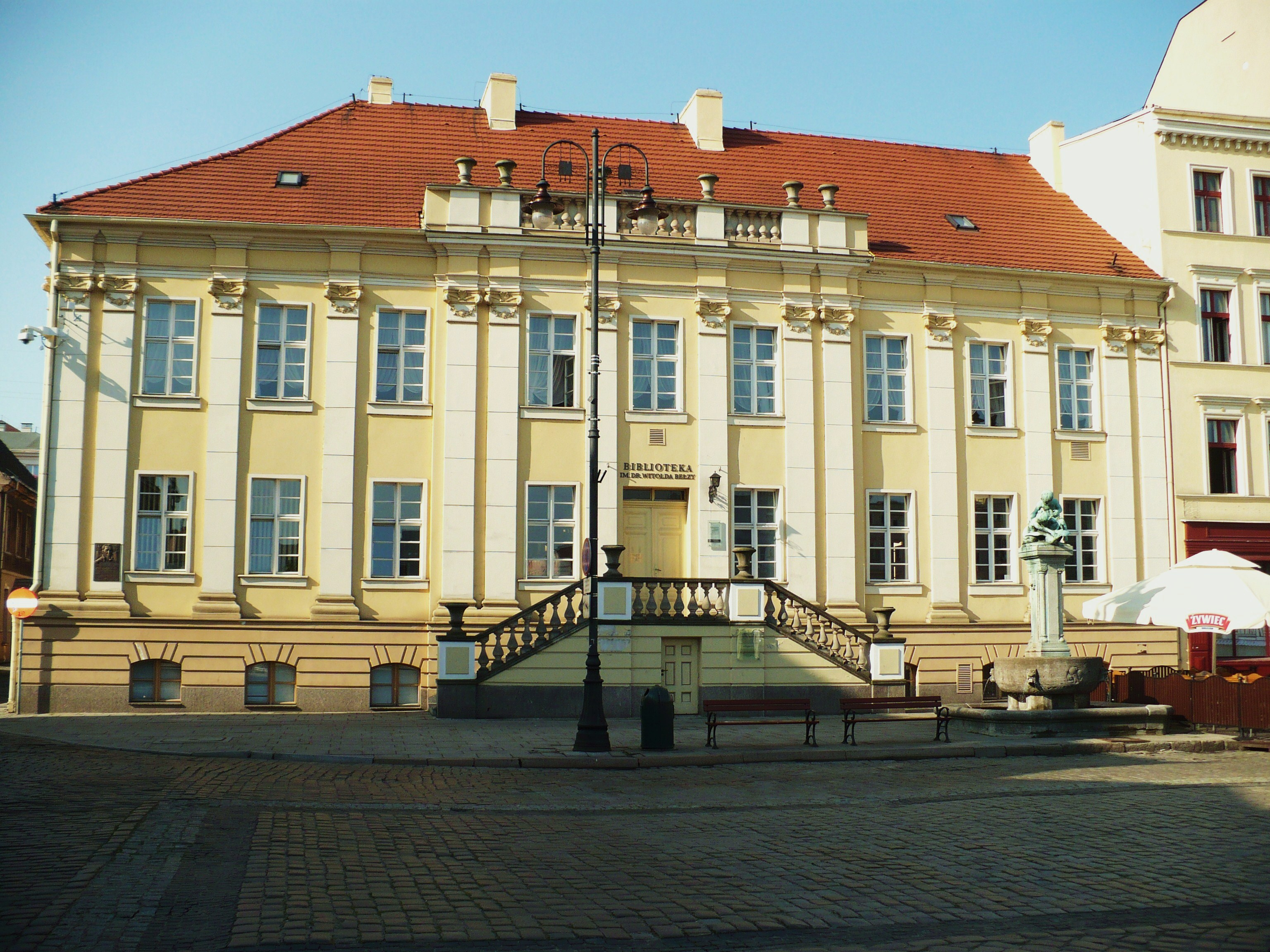
- View from Stary Rynek
- Interactive map of the Voivodeship and Municipal Public Library in Bydgoszcz area

General information
- Type: Library
- Architectural style: Rococo, Neoclassical architecture
- Classification: Nr.601414, ref.A/868 September 03, 1953
- Location: 24 Stary Rynek, 41 Długa street, Bydgoszcz, Poland
- Coordinates: 53°7′16″N 18°00′02″E
- Groundbreaking: 1774
- Completed: 1778
- Renovated: 1876, 1908
- Client: Bydgoszcz City

Technical details
- Floor count: 3

The Voivodeship and Municipal Public Library "Dr. Witold Bełza" in Bydgoszcz is housed in historical buildings located between the Stary Rynek (Old Market square) and Długa street, registered on the Kuyavian-Pomeranian Voivodeship Heritage List. It is the oldest (1903) library in activity in the Kuyavian-Pomeranian Voivodeship. Since 2002, it bears the name of Witold Bełza.

== Library ==
=== Characteristics ===
The public library is an important cultural center of the city with powiat rights Bydgoszcz along with the surrounding Bydgoszcz County, as well as the remainder of the Western part of the Kuyavian-Pomeranian Voivodeship. The institution organizes exhibitions of collections, meetings with authors and numerous events aimed for all ages: in 2014, its various activities gathered more than 31 000 visitors. Bydgoszcz public library comprises 34 branches, among which 10 for children and 17 for adults. The Library ensemble possessed altogether nearly 1 million volumes, had 50 000 registered readers in 2014.

The library has:

- a Department of Special Collections, where are stored valuable works in different reading rooms (journals, bibliographies, Regional publishings);
- a Centre for Economic and Legal Information;
- a dedicated space to the memory of Adam Grzymała-Siedlecki at Libelta Street 5, last place where the author lived.

The library has a valuable antique books, coming from the old Bernardine monastery stock. 10 000 old prints are referenced:

- 98 works produced from the 15th century;
- 758 works from the 16th century;
- 583 works from the 17th century;
- 118 works from the 18th century.

Currently collection includes 97 incunables (issued before 1500), the following ones being the most precious:

- "Homiliae" by Saint John Chrysostom (1466);
- "Rule for all religious" (Polish: Regułę dla wszystkich zakonników) by Girolamo Savonarola, published in Florence in 1495.

Other important volumes:

- 25 editions of the Bible, including 9 from the 15th century;
- 3 editions from the 15th century of the Golden Legend by Jacobus de Voragine;
- 16th century works from printers Aldus Manutius and Christophe Plantin;
- first theological works in Polish of Stanislaus Hosius, Stanisław Sokołowski and Walenty Wróbel;
- "Zwierciadło filozofii" (The Mirror of philosophy) printed by Florian Ungler (1513);
- "Physics" by Aristotle (1519);
- 1910 manuscript "The Oath" (Polish: Rota), by Maria Konopnicka;
- more than 200 maps and plans of Bydgoszcz.

Since 1936, Bernardine library manuscripts are exhibited in the "Royal Hall" and the "Bernardyńska ward" designed by Wiktor Zabielski and Jerzy Rupniewski, with stained glass by Edwarda Kwiatkowski.

The facility is run together by the municipality of Bydgoszcz and the local government of Kuyavian-Pomeranian Voivodeship.

=== History ===
==== Bernardine Monastery Library ====
Origins of the actual institution date back to the creation of the Bernardine library in 1488, which stood at the location of today's Church of Our Lady Queen of Peace. In 1591, Wojciech Język from Sambir, then Bernardine guardian, expanded the monastery and built a new brick room for the library.

The monastery had organised manuscripts into several disciplines:

- Theology, including works by Catholic authors and representatives of the Protestant Reformation and Counter-Reformation;
- Philosophy, with works from ancient authors, scholastics, Renaissance philosophers (Jan of Stobnica, Michał Falkener);
- History, encompassing Roman classics works.

In addition, the library had books dealing with law, geography, mathematics, astronomy, medical science, mining and metallurgy. Stocks comprised also historical incunables, colorfully decorated by Bernardine brother Aleksi, famous for his adorning of antiphonary books.

Most of the books come from purchase or donations, some have been brought by monks travelling abroad (Dionizy Szyjka, Jan of Kościan, Melchior Dębiński, Wawrzyniec of Słupca and others).

In 1574, the starost of Bydgoszcz Jan Kościelecki secured the maintenance of the library by assuring a fixed amount of income from a local sawmill. In 1631, Jan Synodoniusz of Pakość, dying chaplain of the Church of the Holy cross in Bydgoszcz (now gone), bequeathed to the library a sizable collection of books. Likewise the son of Andrzej Rozrażewski, founder of the Poor Clares monastery, gave many Venetian incunables. Other well-known donators include: governor of Kcynia Piotr Czarnkowski (ca 1620), governor of Solec Antoni Grasiński, Bydgoszcz Mayor Wojciech Łochowski or town's woman Elżbieta Szychowa.

The library, its adjoined scriptorium and the Bernardine academic study of philosophy helped to develop a broader intellectual environment in the city. One of the famous professor of the philosophy was Bartłomiej of Bydgoszcz, a bernardine monk who conducted fruitful scholarship work at the local monastery, issuing the first Latin-polish dictionary in 1532. Several written chronicles written at the beginning of the 17th century by Jan of Kościan describe this fertile scholar period.

The library luckily survived the violent times of Polish history, such as the Swedish invasion (1656-1660) or the Great Northern War (1700-1721). In 1810, only 2400 volumes were left in stock; at the dissolution of the monastery in 1829, the library, then under the authority of the Head of the city police, was moved to the nearby House of Loreto's order and at the demolition of the monastery in 1838, the books have been placed in a compartment behind the main altar of the Bernardine Church of Our Lady Queen of Peace. They have been then transferred to the cathedral where they survived until 1907.

At the request of the German authorities, these old volumes have been moved to the stock of Bromberg's Municipal Library. Shortly before the reintegration of Bydgoszcz to the Polish territory in 1920, ecclesiastical authorities (among whom German priest Jan Filipiak) placed these old volumes to the Church of the Holy Trinity, for fear of losing them in the hands of the Germans leaving the city.

==== Municipal Library ====
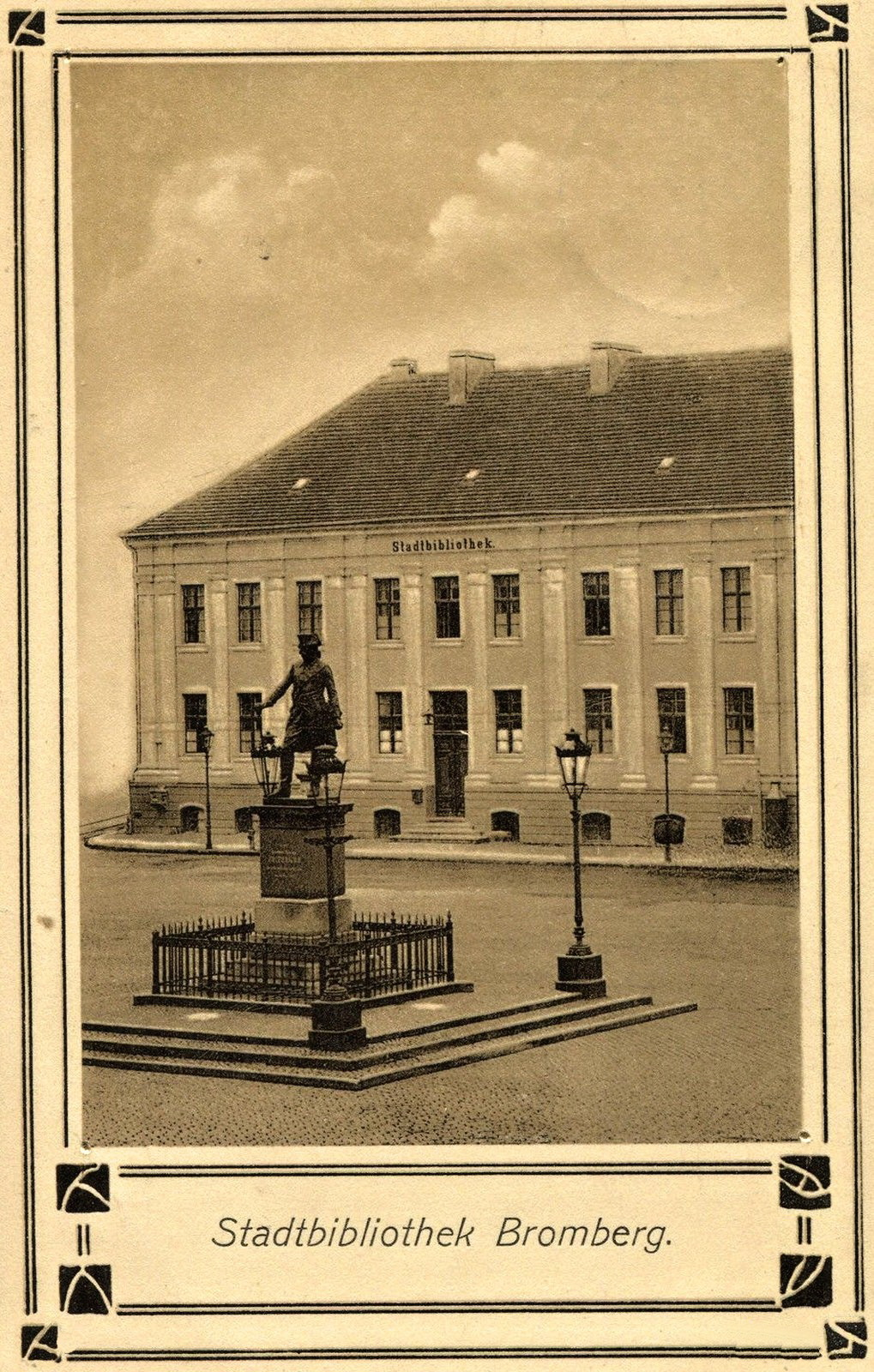
Municipal library 1910

City library was established on October 1, 1903: located initially in a building on the corner of Bernardyńska and Jagiellońska streets, it has then been housed from 1904 to 1906 at Gdańska Street 27 (at the plot where stands today Tenement Carl Meinhardt).

First library resources were offered by German private donators: historian Friedrich Ludwig Georg von Raumer, editor Heinrich Kruse and German scientific societies affiliated to the German Society of Arts and Sciences in Bromberg, mainly Historical Society from Bromberg - Netze District (German: Historische Gesellschaft für den Netzedistrikt zu Bromberg). The first director of the institution was Georg Minde-Pouet, who quickly demonstrated a real ability to acquire the funds needed for the maintenance of the library. He had the building expanded, acquiring a wing on Jana Kazimierza street.

When the building and its resources moved to the hands of Polish authorities in April 1920, the institution consisted of 75 000 volumes, of which only 300 were in Polish. Witold Bełza, the new director, (1920-1939 and 1945-1952), began to acquire more Polish books, and in 1939 the stock increased to 150 000 volumes, including:

- 15th to 18th century manuscripts and books from the former Bernardine Library;
- a collection of nearly 2 700 royal documents, privileges, decrees, manuscripts and autographs;
- the only surviving manuscript of "The Oath" donated by Feliks Nowowiejski;
- a dozen of books from Vladimir Lenin's collection in Poronin, donated by Adam Grzymała-Siedlecki.

During interwar period, the collections of the Municipal Library in Bydgoszcz were regarded as the richest on Kujawy in terms of literature.

During the occupation the library has been isolated, forbidden to be consulted. Part of the Polish-language literature was handed over for destruction, even though many books were rescued by Polish citizens working in the warehouse. The historian Michał Nycz moved many royal manuscripts away from the Nazi authorities. Some of the books were hidden in the Municipal museum or in basements of elementary schools in the suburbs of Bydgoszcz, so as not to be evacuated by German occupation forces. During World War II, 20% of the library stock have been lost, including 99 incunables.

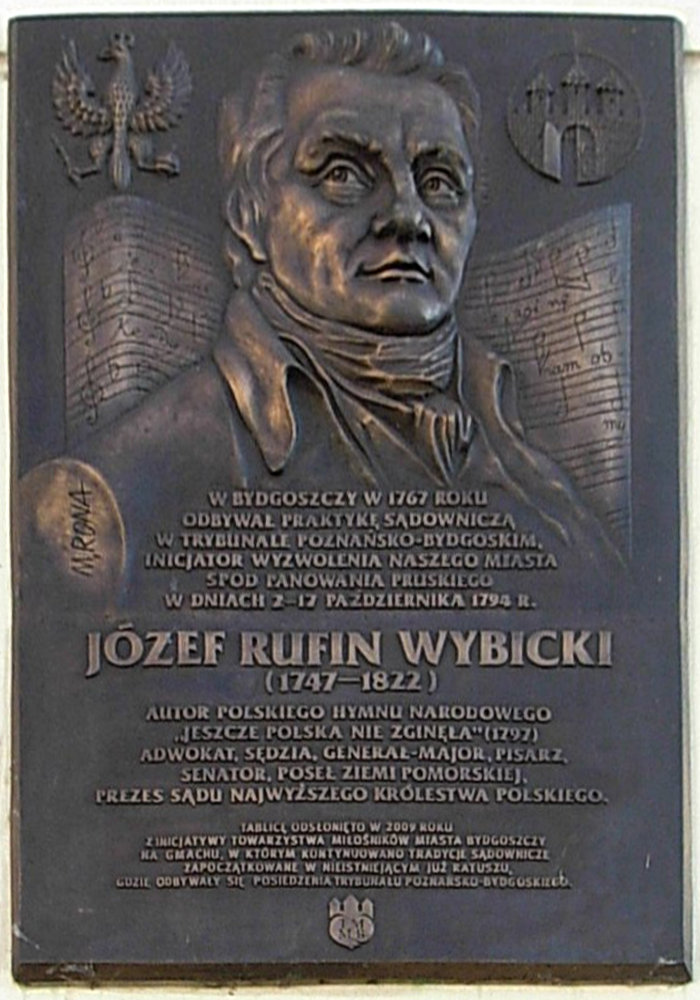
Plaque in memory of Józef Wybicki

After 1946, predominant trend was to collect scientific and popular works. The most valuable items, gathered in the Department of Special Collections, were isolated from the central database in 1953. It included among others, 1382 volumes from the Bernardine library, 4 900 items related to cartography, 972 manuscripts of artists such as Józef Ignacy Kraszewski, Maria Konopnicka, Julian Krzyżanowski, Jan Matejko, Henryk Sienkiewicz, Adam Grzymała-Siedlecki, Leopold Staff, Stanisław Wyspiański and Tadeusz Boy-Żeleński. In 1957, were incorporated into this Department a collection of medals, plaques, stamps, biographical materials of regional activists, and in 1959 a series of small prints.

From the 1950s to the 1970s, the municipal library established many branches throughout the city: a new building has been planned to be erected, but the project was finally rejected and transformed to a major overhaul of the existing edifice. In the 1980s, repairs to a damaged building required to change the location of part of the stock.

In 1968, the institution has been granted a scientific department, and in 1975, the library was labelled as provincial library. In 2009, a plaque in memory of Józef Wybicki, a Polish jurist, political and military activist, has been unveiled on a wall of the Municipal Library, recalling its judicial past.

=== Directors ===
Since its inception, the Municipal Library has been managed by the following directors:

- Jerzy Minde-Pouet (1903-1913);
- Marcin Bollert (1913-1920);
- Witold Bełza (1920-1939);
- Ferdinand Lang (1939-1945);
- Witold Bełza (1945-1952);
- Józef Podgóreczny (1952-1965);
- Mgr. Bolesława Podraza (1965- );
- Mgr. Antoni Sobieszczyk ( -1992);
- Ewa Stelmachowska (1992-2020);
- Krzysztof Gonia (2020- ).

== Buildings ==
The library complex encompasses two main buildings: one at 24 Stary Rynek, one at 41 Długa street.

=== 24 Stary Rynek ===
The building was constructed between 1774 and 1778 in the Neoclassical-Neo-Baroque style, as the seat of the Netze District. From 1781 to 1807, it housed the royal court of West Prussia. During the Duchy of Warsaw (1807-1815), the building contained the seat of the Bydgoszcz Department. Later on, it housed:

- the authorities of the Bromberg (region) (from 1815 to 1838). After this date, the seat moved to the building at 3 Jagiellońska street, now the Regional Office Building;
- the Court of Appeal;
- the Court District and Land Office;

From 1908 onward, the edifice has been welcoming the Municipal Library. Before 1908, along Jana Kazimierza street and Zaułek street stood a one-level building, lower than the main edifice, where was established a printing house. Between 1987 and 1999, this edifice has been thoroughly renovated, restoring the original architectural elements of the façade.

The building displays architecture elements recalling the urban residence style, mixing late Rococo and early Neoclassical styles. The front elevation on Stary Rynek boasts 14 pilaster with ionic-type capitals. The central part of the facade is crowned with a line of vases and balustrade, mirroring the decoration of the double entrance stairs below. The basement ceiling exhibits vaults and cross vaults. A reconstruction in 1870-1876 dismantled the attic facade and the monumental staircase covered with a balustrade.

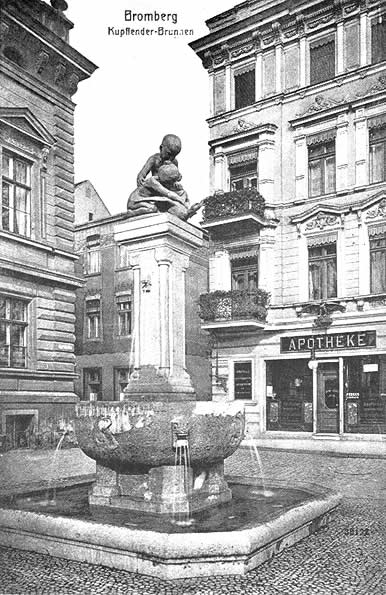
"The Well" in 1914 in front of the pharmacy "Under the golden eagle"

=== 41 Długa street ===
This building has been erected in 1798 for the needs of the court of West Prussia. It became in 1903 property of the Kingdom of Prussia, and served as the seat of the court hearing till the completion of the edifice on 3 Jagiellońska street. Later on it housed the Municipal Police (Friedrichstraße 58).

Between both library buildings runs the narrow Zaułek street: to unite the architectural ensemble, a covered passage called the "Bridge of Sighs" (Polish: Most Westchnień), has been built in 1920.

Since the 1920s, the Municipal Library owns the edifice. The outbuilding on the first floor harbours a collection of antique books from the ancient Bernardine monastery library, which stood in the 16th century in Bernardyńska Street.

The building at 41 Długa has a "L" shape with a side outbuilding and the main entrance on the south elevation. The facades are divided by vertical pilasters and horizontal cornices. The vaulted cellars are still preserved. The edifice is topped by a Mansard roof with eyelid dormers.

=== Fountain ===
The fountain called "The Well" (Polish: Studzienka) was unveiled on October 4, 1909. Its creator was sculptor Karol Kowalczewski, and the funder Alfred Kupffender, owner of the pharmacy "Under the Golden Eagle" (Polish: Pod Złotym Orłem), located on Stary Rynek. The sculpture commemorated the 100th anniversary of the pharmacy, and stood nearby the shop on the western part of the square: Alfred Kupffender donated it in gratitude towards the municipal authorities which decided to disband the geese-market which used to be held in front of the Golden Eagle pharmacy.

In 1940, Nazis authorities began to destroy the Jesuit Church that stood on Stary Rynek, and doing so demolished "The Well". Parts of the sculpture, stored in public gardens, survived the occupation period. Franciszek Górski, stationmaster at a warehouse, even saved those bronze pieces from being melting away for military purposes.

After the end of World War II, a newly cast "The Well", has been unveiled on May 1, 1948, moving its original location to stand right before the main elevation of the Municipal Public Library on Stary Rynek.

The buildings are registered on the Kuyavian-Pomeranian Voivodeship Heritage List Nr.601414 Reg.A/868, since September 3, 1953.

== Gallery ==
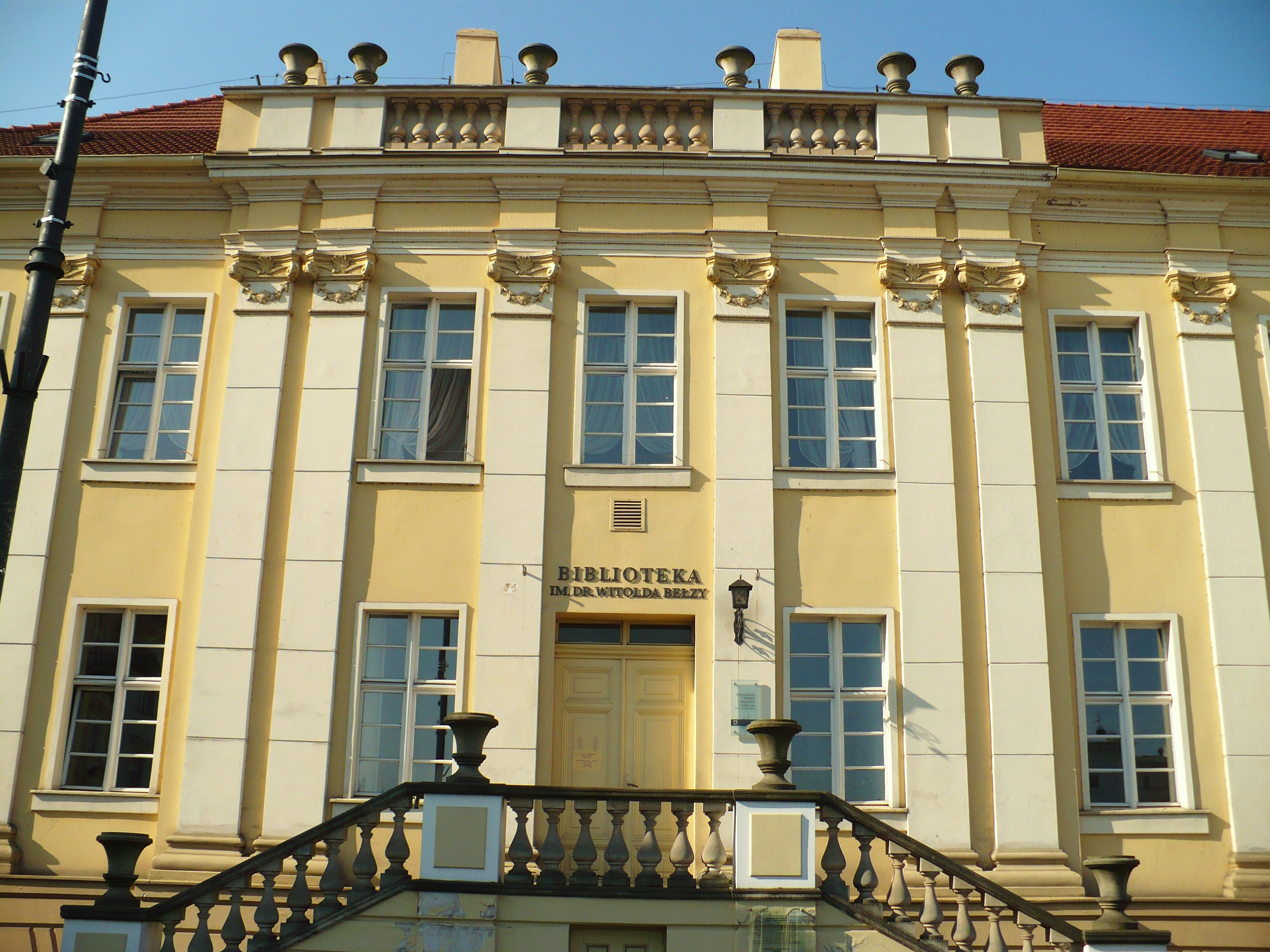
Detail of the facade on Stary Rynek

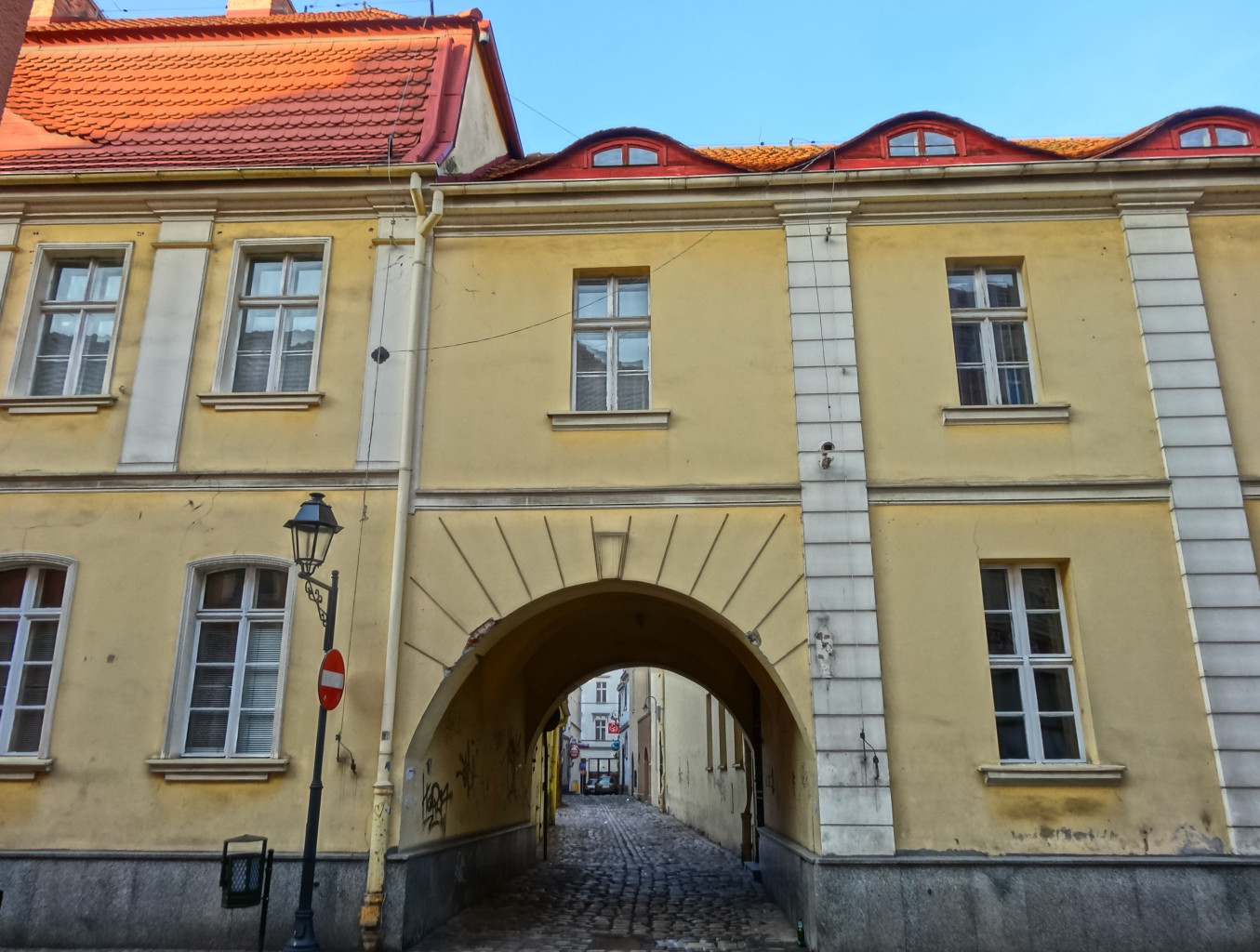
View of the passage over Zaułek Street linking both buildings

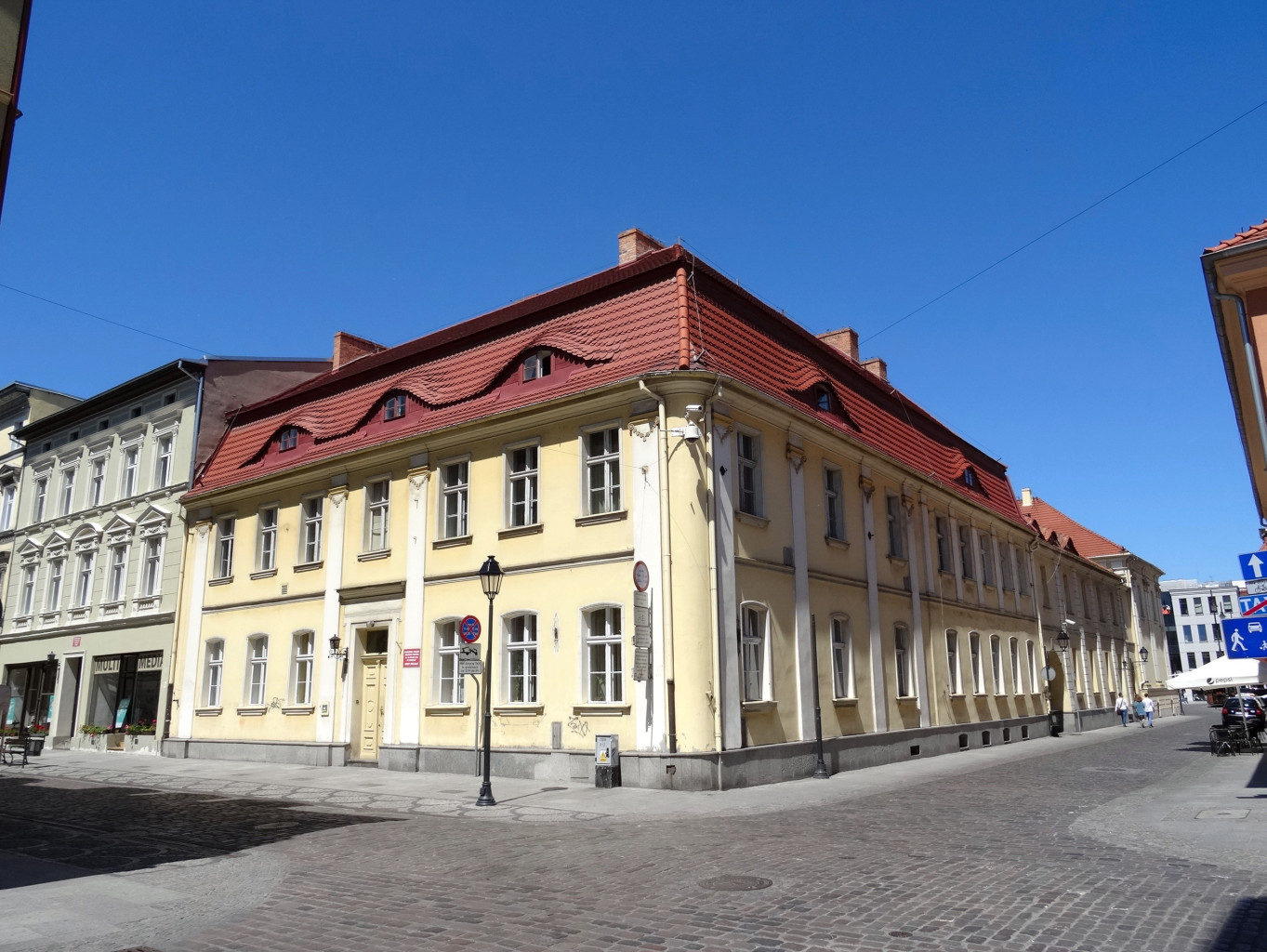
Building at Długa street 41

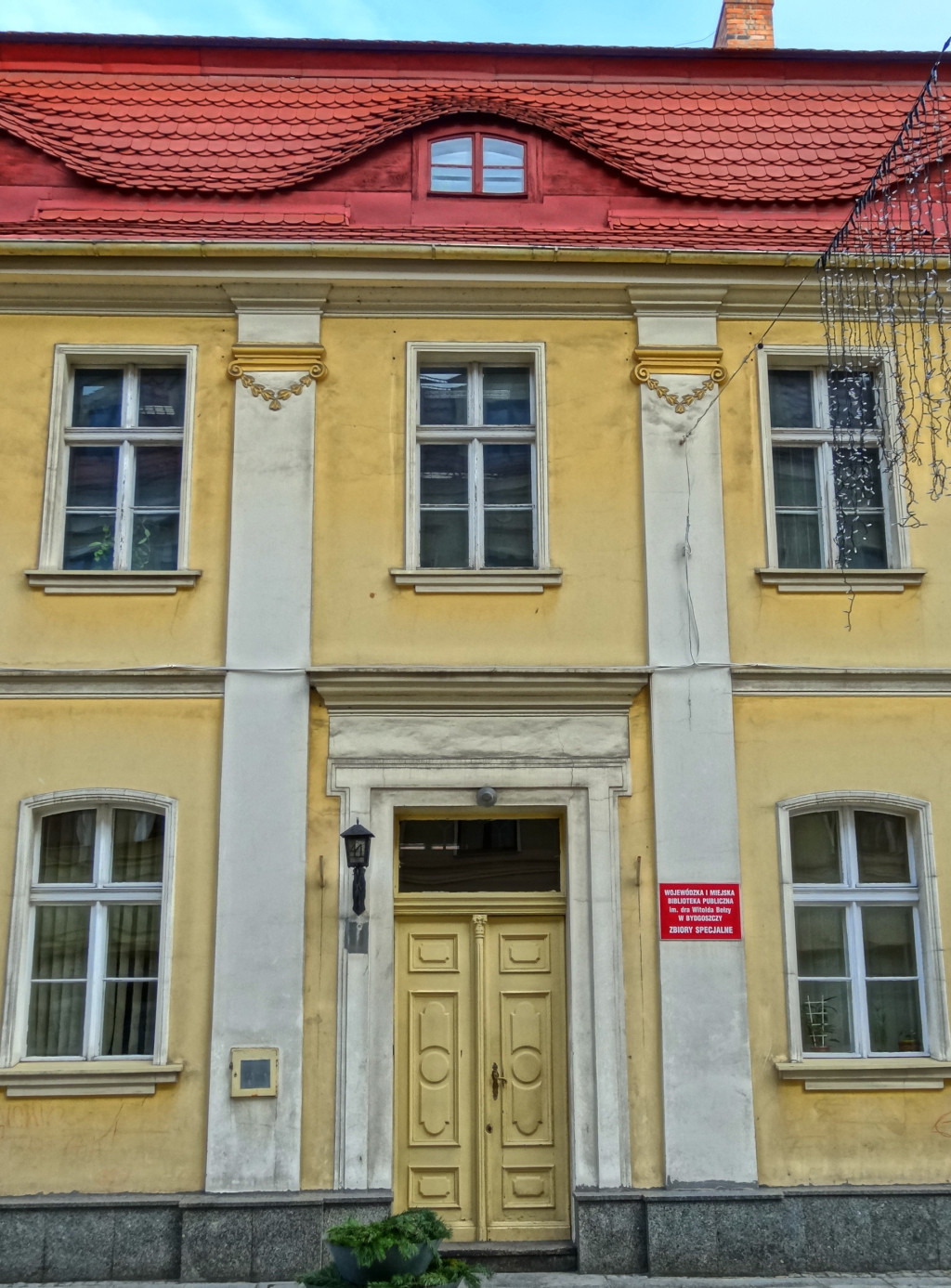
Detail of the facade on Długa street

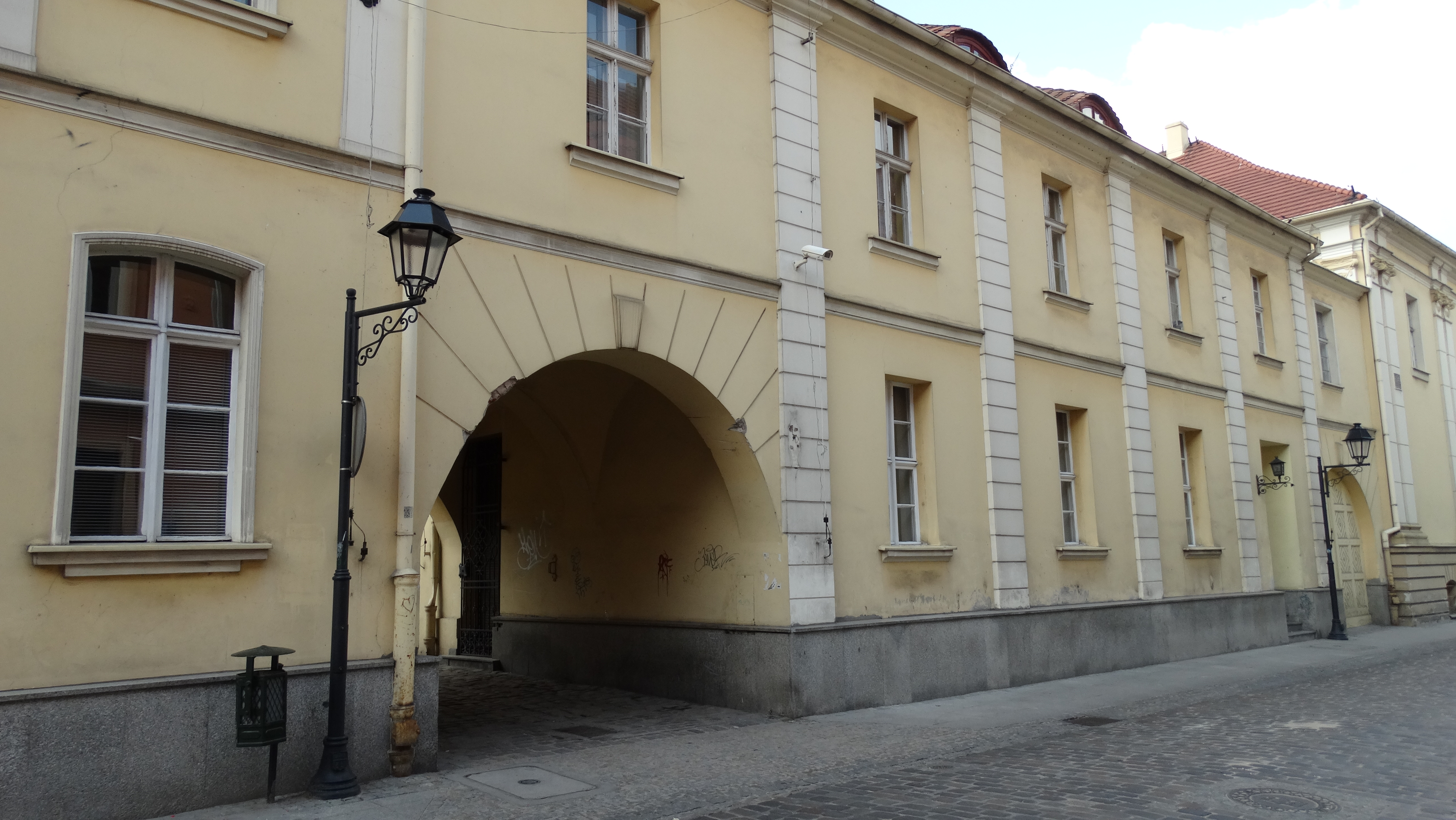
View of both buildings from Jana Kazimierza street

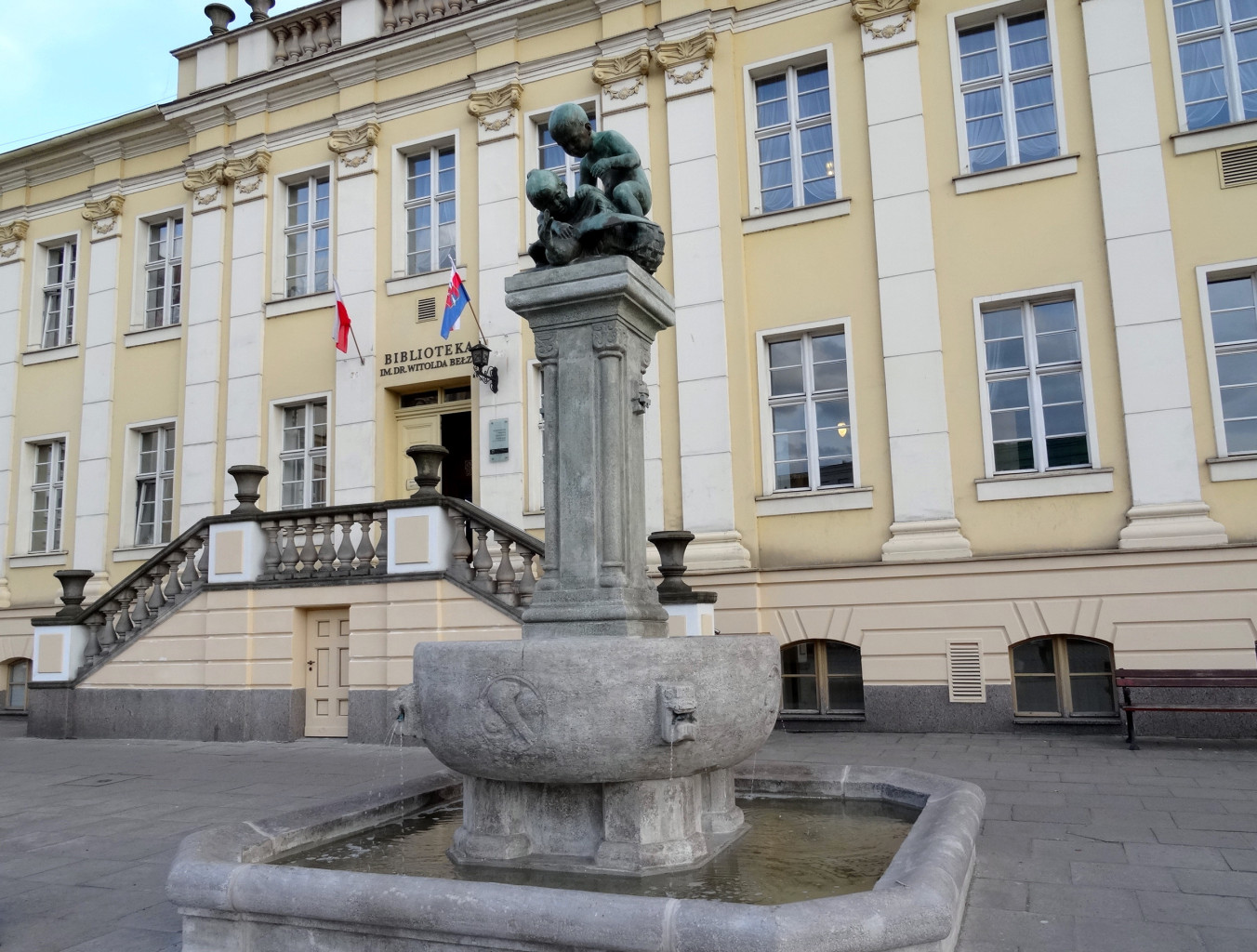
Fountain "The Well"

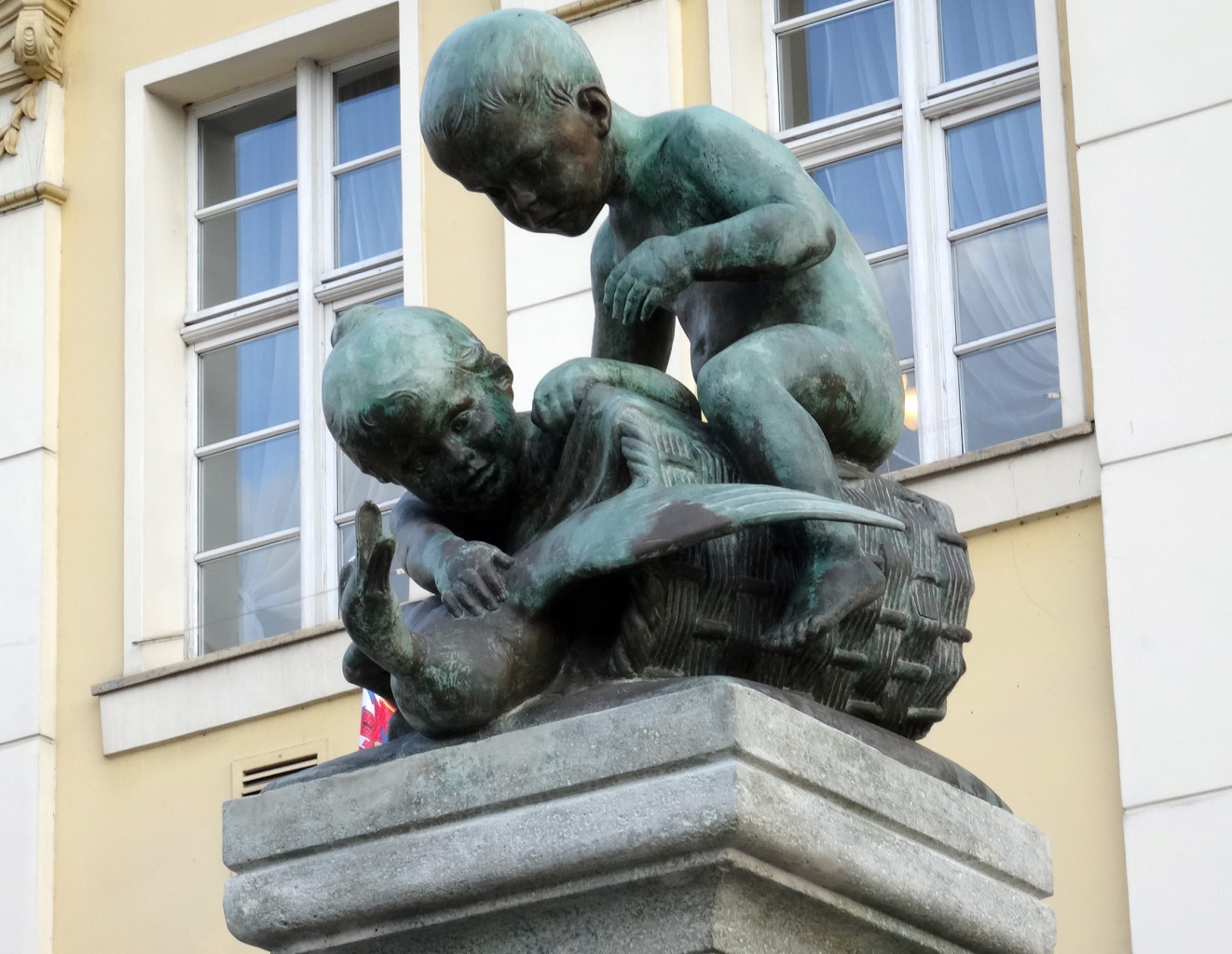
Detail of the sculpture

== See also ==
- Bydgoszcz
- Adam Grzymała-Siedlecki
- Bernardyńska Street in Bydgoszcz
- Długa street in Bydgoszcz
- Gdańska Street, Bydgoszcz
- List of libraries in Poland

== Bibliography ==
- (in Polish) Rymkiewicz, Anna (1998). Hugon Bräsicke i jego biblioteka. Kalendarz Bydgoski. Bydgoszcz: Towarzystwo Miłośników Miasta Bydgoszczy. pp. 191–196.
- (in Polish) Parucka, Krystyna (2008). Zabytki Bydgoszczy – minikatalog. Bydgoszcz: "Tifen" Krystyna Parucka. ISBN 9788392719106.
- (in Polish) Pietrzak, Zofia (1996). Jak rodził się bydgoski księgozbiór. Kalendarz Bydgoski. Bydgoszcz: Towarzystwo Miłośników Miasta Bydgoszczy. pp. 136–144.
- (in Polish) Umiński, Janusz (1996). Bydgoszcz. Przewodnik. Bydgoszcz: Regionalny Oddział PTTK „Szlak Brdy”. ISBN 9788321725239.
- (in Polish) Iłowski, Henryk (2001). Geniusz loci bernardynów bydgoskich. Kalendarz Bydgoski. Bydgoszcz: Towarzystwo Miłośników Miasta Bydgoszczy. pp. 136–144.
- (in Polish) Biskup, Marian (1991). Historia Bydgoszczy. Tom I do roku 1920. Warszawa-Poznań: Bydgoskie Towarzystwo Naukowe.
- (in Polish) Guldon Zenon, Kabaciński Ryszard (1975). Szkice z dziejów dawnej Bydgoszczy XVI-XVIII w. Bydgoszcz: Bydgoskie Towarzystwo Naukowe.
- (in Polish) Kantak, Kamil (1933). Z przeszłości bernardynów bydgoskich. Przegląd Bydgoski Rocznik n 2. Bydgoszcz: Komitet Wydawniczy. pp. 3–13.
- (in Polish) Malewski, Zygmunt (1936). Bibliotheca Bernardina. Przegląd Bydgoski Rocznik n 3-4. Bydgoszcz: Komitet Wydawniczy. pp. 53–66.
- (in Polish) Mincer, Franciszek (1991). Biblioteka bernardynów bydgoskich i jej ofiarodawcy. Kronika Bydgoska XI. Bydgoszcz: Towarzystwo Miłosnikow Miasta Bydgoszczy - Bydgoskie Towarzystwo Naukowe. pp. 221–236.
