= Constantin Regamey =

Polish musician, composer, critic (1907-1982)

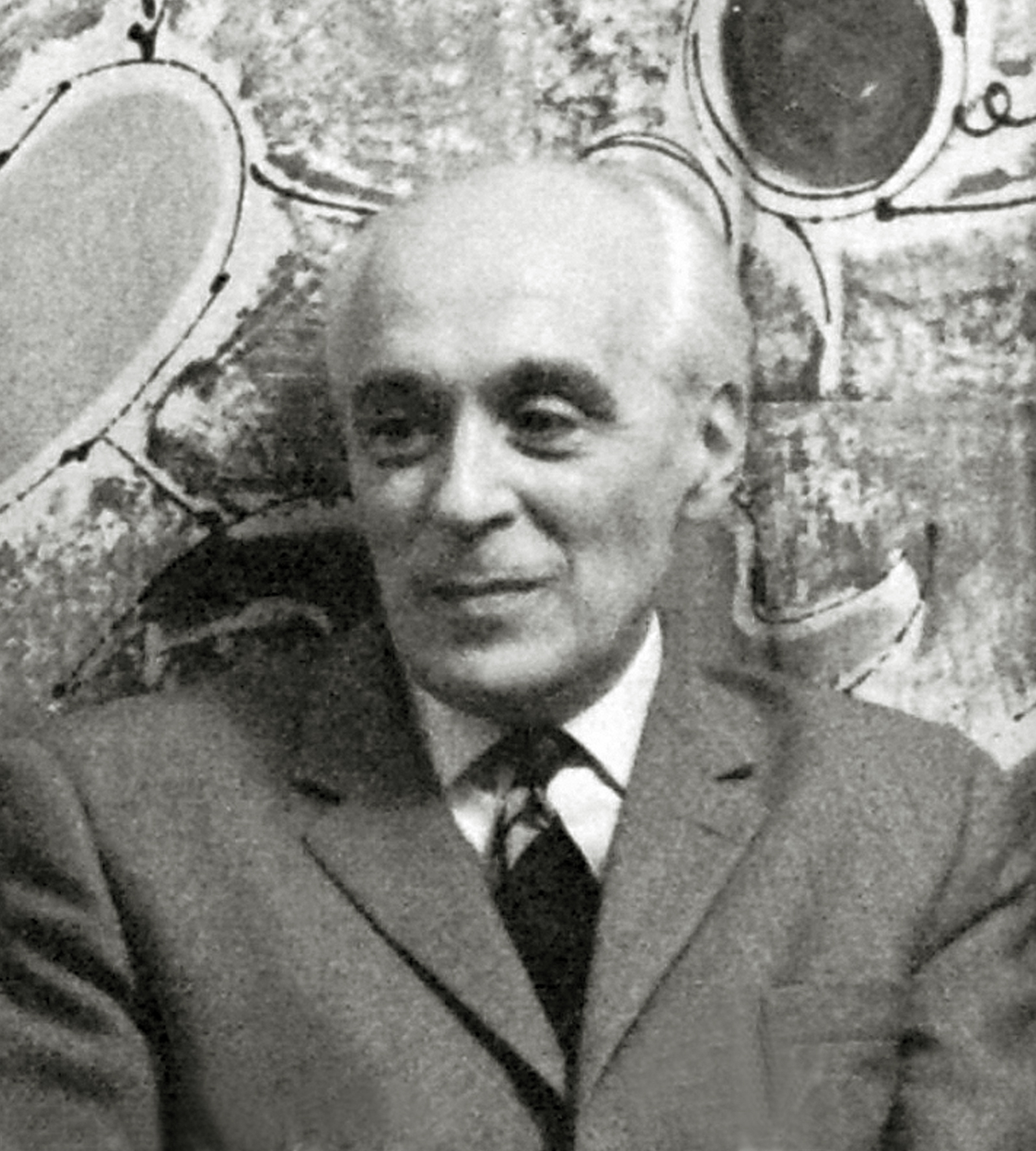
- Constantin Regamey (March, 1967)
- Born: 28 January 1907; Kiev, Ukraine
- Died: 27 December 1982 (aged 75); Lausanne, Switzerland
- Education: University of Warsaw
- Occupations: Philologist, Orientalist, musician, composer and critic
- Spouse: Anna Janina Kucharska

Constantin Regamey (28 January 1907 – 27 December 1982) was a philologist, orientalist, musician, composer, and critic. He was a significant presence among intellectual and artistic circles in Warsaw during the 1930s and later a professor at the Universities of Lausanne and Fribourg.

== Biography ==
Born in Kiev of Swiss and Polish ancestry, at the age of 13 Regamey moved to Warsaw, where he studied piano with Józef Turczyński and music theory with Felicjan Szopski. In 1931, he received a degree from the University of Warsaw in oriental and classical philology. He became a lecturer there in 1936. In 1937 he married Anna Janina Kucharska, a student of Romance Philology at the Jagiellonian University in Kraków. From 1937 to 1939, he edited the magazine Muzyka Polska and was very active as a music critic.

Regamey remained in Poland during the Second World War. Under the pseudonym Czesław Drogowski, he engaged with underground resistance organizations as a courier in the Army. During the war he continued to be active in the musical life of Warsaw, playing in bars and cafes and participating in the International Society for Contemporary Music. He also taught himself the principles of composition and began composing seriously in 1942. He later studied composition formally with Kazimierz Sikorski. In 1944 he completed a quintet for clarinet, bassoon, violin, cello and piano that was admired by Witold Lutosławski. In this piece, Regamey was among the first Polish composers to use twelve-tone technique.

Following the defeat of the Warsaw Uprising in October 1944, he moved to Lausanne, Switzerland. In 1945, he became professor of Slavic and Oriental languages at the University of Lausanne. He also taught linguistics at the University of Fribourg beginning in 1946. During this time he delivered lectures abroad in India and Egypt and published books and articles on oriental philology and Buddhist philosophy. He continued to compose, many of his works being premiered by the Swiss conductor Paul Sacher. His works were also performed at the Donaueschingen Festival. From 1963 to 1968 he was President of the Schweizerische Tonkünstlerverein. Regamey died in 1982, four years after his retirement.

== Selected works ==
- Persian Songs [version III] for bass-baritone and chamber orchestra (1942);
- Quintet for clarinet, bassoon, violin, cello and piano (1942-1944);
- String Quartet No 1 (1948)
- Adam Mickiewicz: homme et poète. Lausanne: Université de Lausanne, 1949;
- Buddhistische Philosophie. Bern: Francke, 1950;
- Musikschaffen und Musikleben in Polen. Köln: Osteuropa-Handbuch, 1959.
- Der Buddhismus Indiens. Aschaffenburg: Pattloch, 1964;
- Lila. Double Concerto for violin, cello and small orchestra (1976);
- The Bhadramāyākāravyākaraṇa: introduction, Tibetan text, translation, and notes. Delhi: Motilal Banarsidass Publishers, 1990.
- The Question of Primitive Buddhism in the Closing Works of Stanislaw Schayer. The Eastern Buddhist, New Series, Vol. 48, No. 1 (2017), p. 23-47.
