= Karol Mondral =

Painter, Poland, 19th–20th century

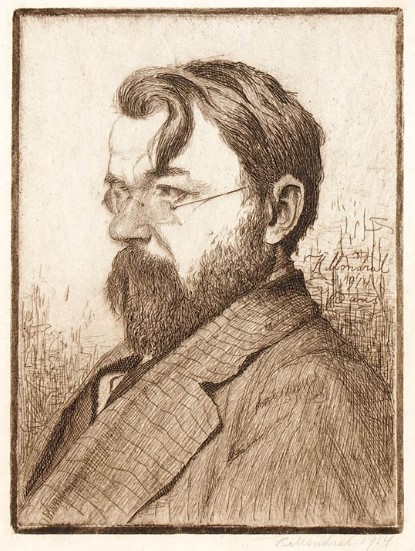
- Karol Mondral, Self-portrait 1914
- Born: Karol Mondral; January 26, 1880; Warsaw, Kingdom of Poland
- Died: December 16, 1957 (aged 77); Poznań, Poland
- Occupation: Painter

Karol Mondral (1880–1957) was a Polish painter and graphic artist.

== Biography ==
=== Youth ===
Karol Mondral was born on January 25, 1880, in Warsaw, to Jan Mondral and Maria née Paczuska. His father ran a small painting and decoration workshop in the district of Powiśle.

Between 1894 and 1900, he studied at the Warsaw Drawing School (now the Academy of Fine Arts in Warsaw) with professors such as Wojciech Gerson, Jan Kauzik or Adam Badowski.

In 1902 Karol went to Kraków to continue his studies at the Academy of Fine Arts, in the class of Leon Wyczółkowski. It was under Wyczółkowski's influence that Mondral turned his interest to Japanese woodcuts. Unfortunately, the death his father forced him to return to Warsaw, so as to take care of his mother and younger siblings. He took over the workshop, making portraits, designing posters, playbills, book covers, models for nearby Hempel factory, but was still dreaming of graphic design.

In 1905 Mondral, an excellent violinist, met Romana Pogorzelska at concerts she used to organized, while working at a piano factory. They married on August 27, 1907.

=== Life in Paris ===
Stefan Stasiak, a friend of the young couple, went to Paris to pursue oriental studies: he invited Romana and Karol to visit him. French composer Louis Fleury (1878–1926) and his rich wife offered the painter a loan of 50 rubles for the trip the couple made in 1909.

In the French capital, Modral perfected his technique of etching. Romana and Karol settled in Montparnasse, at "La Ruche".

He made also many trips around France and Switzerland, while looking for subjects for his works.

A wealthy American businessman would come to Paris once a year, buying everything Mondral managed to create. Thanks to him, the artist could rent a second studio and open his own etching press.

Initially, the artist showed in his engravings picturesque corners of the French province ("Saint-Jean-de-Luz"-1912, "The Fish Merchant"-1912, "The guy from Concarneau-1915), working the landscape in Whistler's way. He meticulously recreated the varied texture of stone facades in small-town streets, rendering the blurred architectural details of Paris fragmented buildings ("Cluny Abbey"-1912) or the decorative lattice of tree branches, like in Japanese woodcuts ("By the Seine"-1910).

This period was one of intense creativity, which allowed him to participate in salon exhibitions. Furthermore, his friend Konstanty Brandel was the owner of several Japanese prints which were a constant source of inspiration for Mondral.

During World War I the family lived mainly in Paris and traveled to Brittany and Lake Geneva. Romana, like other Polish women, actively supported Poles fighting in the Russian army on the Eastern Front, as mentioned by Karol's daughter Camilla in her biography.

In November 1918 Karol took part in an exhibition organized to the benefits of the invalids of the Polish Army in France, together with 38 other artists. In the early 1920s, Konstanty Brandel came from newly independent Poland with a job offer at the "State School of Art Industry" in Bydgoszcz.

=== Back to Poland ===
==== Bydgoszcz ====
On April 1, 1922, Mondral returned to Poland and settled in Bydgoszcz, working as the head of the Graphic Department at the National School of Arts and Crafts. The family lived at 11 Świętej Trójcy street and then in a villa at 3 Chopina street.

At the school, Karol set up a vocational school for printers. Furthermore, he accepted a commissioning of the City Council for making etchings of views of Bydgoszcz: hence he documented the municipal architecture with around 100 engravings.

==== Poznań and Warsaw ====
On March 1, 1931, the painter was hired as a professor at the Faculty of Graphic Arts of the State School of Decorative Arts (Polish: Państwowa Szkoła Sztuk Zdobnicznych) in Poznań. Karol and his family only moved in September 1932, changing apartments several times.

He eventually chaired the school studio of lithography and dry-engraving techniques until the outbreak of World War II.

The start of the conflict found Mondral in Warsaw, on his way from Krzemieniec to Poznań. In the Polish capital, he received a sentence from the Nazi authorities to move to a resettlement camp in Poznań, then to a transit camp near Lublin. Back anew in Warsaw, he left the city at the outbreak of the Warsaw Uprising in 1944, ending in Tarnów.

During the occupation, the family's flat in Poznań was occupied by German soldiers: most of the furnishings and the works were looted (160 oil paintings, 200 plates of copper engravings, etchings, aquatints, about 60 woodcuts, about 130 copies, sculptures and valuable works by other artists).

In 1945 he returned to Poznań and became a lecturer of graphic sciences at the State Higher School of Fine Arts.

He retired in 1950. On the occasion of the 50th anniversary of artistic work, he received a touching gift - a graphic portfolio made by his students, dated June 28, 1952.

Karol Mondral died in Poznań on December 16, 1957. His remains rest together with his wife at the cemetery of Pyry, Warsaw, where his daughter Camilla had them transferred in 1983.

== Exhibitions ==
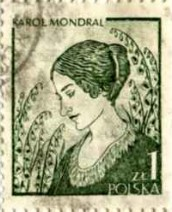
Polish stamp from 1979

Karol Mondral took part in the "Henryk Grohman Graphic Competition":

- in 1911, he received the first prize in Zakopane with the etching "Shoemaker";
- in 1914, for the second edition, he was awarded the second prize with the etching "Zuzanna".

In Paris the painter could exhibit in solo at two occasions: in 1919 at the "Société Nationale des Beaux-Arts" and in 1921 at the seat of "L'Association France-Pologne".

In Poland, he presented his works at:

- the "Society for the Encouragement of Fine Arts in Warsaw" (1903–39);
- the Polish Art Society (1931);
- the "Instytut Propagandy Sztuki" (Institute for the Propaganda of Art) (1936).

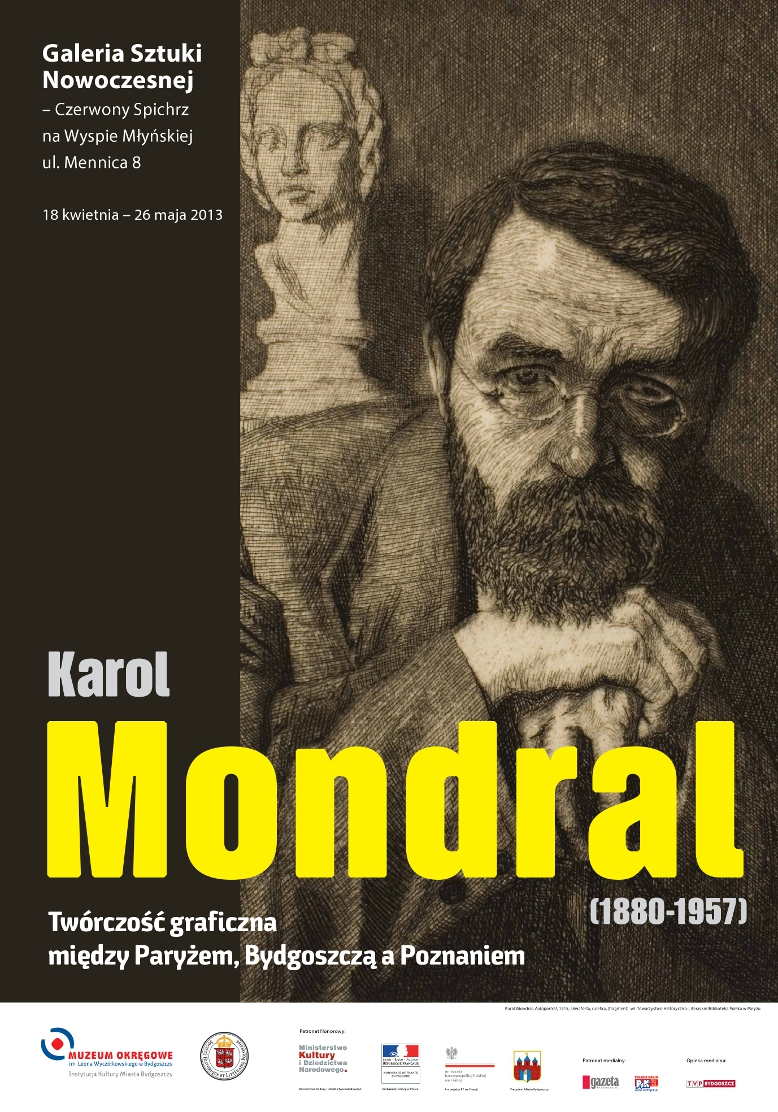
Poster of the 2013 Exhibition

Additionally, Mondral took part in many exhibitions in and around his country:

- Lviv (1913, 1916, 1926, 1928, 1930);
- Warsaw – individual exposition (1923, 1930);
- Poznań (1925, 1927, 1929, 1930, 1932, 1933) – individual exposition (1928, 1947);
- Bydgoszcz (1924, 1931, 1932, 1936);
- Zamość (1926), Łódź (1925), Toruń (1930), Kraków (1931) and Vilnius (1931).

In 1959 a posthumous exhibition was held in Poznań presenting a cross-section of Mondral's work, with 157 graphics from 1910 to 1938 and 14 oil paintings between 1913 and 1953.

In May 1979 Poczta Polska issued a stamp commemorating Karol Mondral, displaying one of his etchings, "Portret żony z naparstnicami" (Portrait of a wife with digitalis), supposedly inspired by his wife.

In the 21st century the following exhibitions have been set up in his memory:

- "Karol Mondral, 1880–1957", in Bydgoszcz (2012);
- In 2013, "Karol Mondral. Twórczość graficzna między Paryżem, Bydgoszczą a Poznaniem" (Karol Mondral. Graphic arts between Paris, Bydgoszcz and Poznań), displayed in Bydgoszcz, Poznan and Paris (at the Bibliothèque Polonaise de Paris).

== Works ==
Mondral mainly used techniques on metal for creating etchings, aquatints or drypoint and soft varnish. He less often used lithography and woodcut (though in Paris he dealt more frequently with color woodcuts).

He realized as well some paintings:

- Figural scenes influenced by Jacek Malczewski symbolist style;
- Portraits;
- Impressionist landscapes and still lifes with flowers.

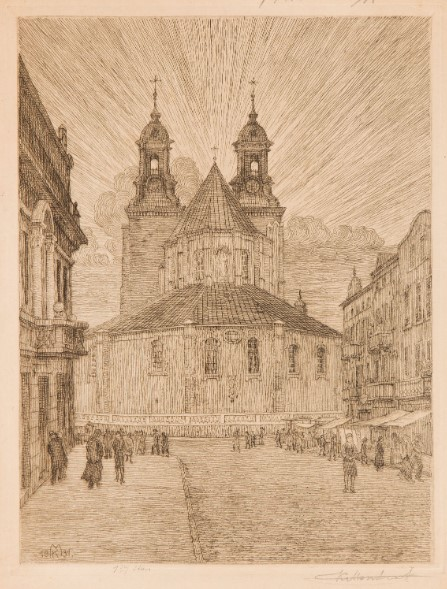
Cathedral in Gniezno, Aquaforte, 1931

Karol Mondral's prints decorated the tourist class cabins of the ocean liner "Piłsudski", which interiors were adorned in 1934 by a team of 78 Polish artists.

Nowadays his works can be found in private collections and in many public places, among which:

- the "Stanisław Fischer Museum" in Bochnia;
- Warsaw's University Library and National Museum;
- the National Museum in Poznań;
- the Ossoliński National Institute in Wrocław;
- Toruń's University Library and Provincial and Municipal Library;
- Bydgoszcz's "Witold Bełza Public Library" and Leon Wyczółkowski District Museum.

=== Non exhaustive list of Mondral's creations ===
Etchings:

- "Portret młodej kobiety" (Portrait of a young woman), 1910
- "Bazylika w Lourdes, 1912 and 1914
- "Saint-Étienne-du-Mont", 1912
- "Śniadanie" (Portrait of his wife and his daughter), 1912
- "Sosna" (Pine), 1912
- "Portret Stefana Stasiaka" (Portrait of Stefan Stasiak), 1912
- "Tragarz" (A porter), Provence, 1912
- "Camilla przy piersi" (Camilla at the breast), 1912
- "Głowa dziecka" (Portrait of his daughter), 1912
- "Zaprzęg prowansalski" (Provence group), 1912
- "Portret mężczyzny" (Portrait of a man ), 1913
- "Powrót z połowu" (Back from the catch), Portrieux, 1913
- "Wyjazd na letnisko" (Departure to the summer resort), 1913
- "Mężczyzna nad brzegiem morza" (Man on the sea side), ca. 1913
- "Dziewczynka w stroju bretońskim" (Girl in Brittany costume), 1914
- "Tryptyk z Portrieux" (Portrieux triptych), ca. 1914
- "Chęciny", 1914
- Scena w porcie (Harbour scene ), 1915
- "Ruiny" (Ruins), 1915
- "Brzeg Bałtyku w Karwi" (The shore of the Baltic Sea in Karwia), 1920s
- "Rodzina" (Family), 1920s
- "Most nad Sekwaną" (Bridge over the Seine), 1920
- "Portret Konstantego Brandla" (Portrait of Konstanty Brandel), 1921
- "Głowa wieśniaka" (Peasant's head), Brittany, 1925
- "Na targu", (At the market), 1926
- "Katedra w Gnieźnie" (Cathedral in Gniezno), 1927–1931, made for the jubilee of the Archdiocese of Gniezno
- "Kościółek w Siernieczku" (Church in Siernieczek), 1928
- "Portret rybaka" (Portrait of a fisherman), 1927–1931
- "Łan", 1930
- "W Puszczykowie" (In Puszczykowo), after 1945

Woodcuts:

- "Pokłon pasterzy" (Adoration of the shepherds), 1917
- "Archanioł Michał" (English: Archangel Michael), 1919
- "Profil górala" (Highlander profile)

Paintings:

- "Wawel", 1903
- "Bajka" (Fairytale), 1909
- "Dziewczynka" (Girl), 1923
- "Wiejska Sielanka" (Rural ideal), 1945

== Membership ==
Karol Mondral was a member of various artistic associations:

- Stowarzyszenie Polskich Artystów Grafików (Association of Polish Graphic Artists);
- Grupa Plastyków Wielkopolskich "Plastyka" (Visual Artists Group of Greater Poland Voivodeship – "Plastyka");
- Związek Plastyków Pomorskich w Bydgoszczy (Association of Graphic Artists in Bydgoszcz);
- Towarzystwo Zachęty Sztuk Pięknych (Society for the Encouragement of Fine Arts in Warsaw).

== Family ==
Karol Mondral married Romana Pogorzelska in 1907. They had a daughter, Camilla.

Camilla was born in Paris on June 30, 1911. She went to the "Bydgoszcz Catholic Humanities Gymnasium for girls" (Żeńskie Gimnazjum Humanistyczne), today's High School No. 6, Bydgoszcz.

In Poznań she studied at the Higher School of Commerce and at the Faculty of Diplomatic, Consular, Commerce and Economics of the university, from where she graduated respectively in 1931 and 1932. She was an accomplished member of the Polish national team in athletics and fencing.

Working as a clerk at the Ministry of Military Affairs, she transferred to Romania at the start of World War II, then moved to Hungary. There she joined the secret courier service but was arrested at the end of the conflict and sentenced to forced labor in Austria.

She came back to Warsaw in 1945 and worked in the Supply Organization Office at the Ministry of Industry. In 1948, she became the director of the State Trade Center. From 1950 to 1956, she had a position in the editorial office of Hungarian literature at the Czytelnik Publishing House. From 1959, she also collaborated with the "Jerzy Giedroyc Literary Institute" (today's "Kultura Literary Institute Association"). A writer and an outstanding translator of Hungarian literature, she became member of the Polish Writers' Union in 1953. In 1976, she was one of the signatories of "Memorial 101", an open letter of Polish intellectuals against the changes to the Constitution of the Polish People's Republic. In 1980, she was admitted to the PEN Club.

In 1948 she married Andrzej Pęksa, a skier and Tatra Mountains guide, but divorced him two years later. They had a son, Stefan-Kuba Pęksa.

Camilla Mondrat died in 2002 in Warsaw; she was buried at the Pyry cemetery of Warsaw.

== See also ==
- Bydgoszcz
- Voivodeship and Municipal Public Library, Bydgoszcz
- (in Polish) Camilla Mondral
- (in Polish) Stefan Stasiak
- (in Polish) Plastyka grupa artystyczna
- (in Polish) Memoriał 101

== Bibliography ==
- Woźniak, Michał (2013). Karol Mondral [Karol Mondral] (in Polish). Bydgoszcz: Muzeum Okręgowe im. Leona Wyczółkowskiego.
- Bazial, Jolanta (May 6, 2013). Karol Mondral – życie i twórczość [Karol Mondral - Life and work] (in Polish). Bydgoszcz: Akant.
- Grąbczewska, Małgorzata Maria (April 2013). Le regard tourné vers le Soleil-Levant? Les inspirations japonaises de Karol Mondral [Looking towards the Rising Sun? The Japanese inspirations of Karol Mondral] (in French). Gdańsk: academia.edu.
