= High School No. 6, Bydgoszcz =

High school in Bydgoszcz, Poland

Jan and Jędrzej Śniadecki High School Nr.6 in Bydgoszcz
- Polish: VI Liceum Ogólnokształcące im. Jana i Jędrzeja Śniadeckich w Bydgoszczy
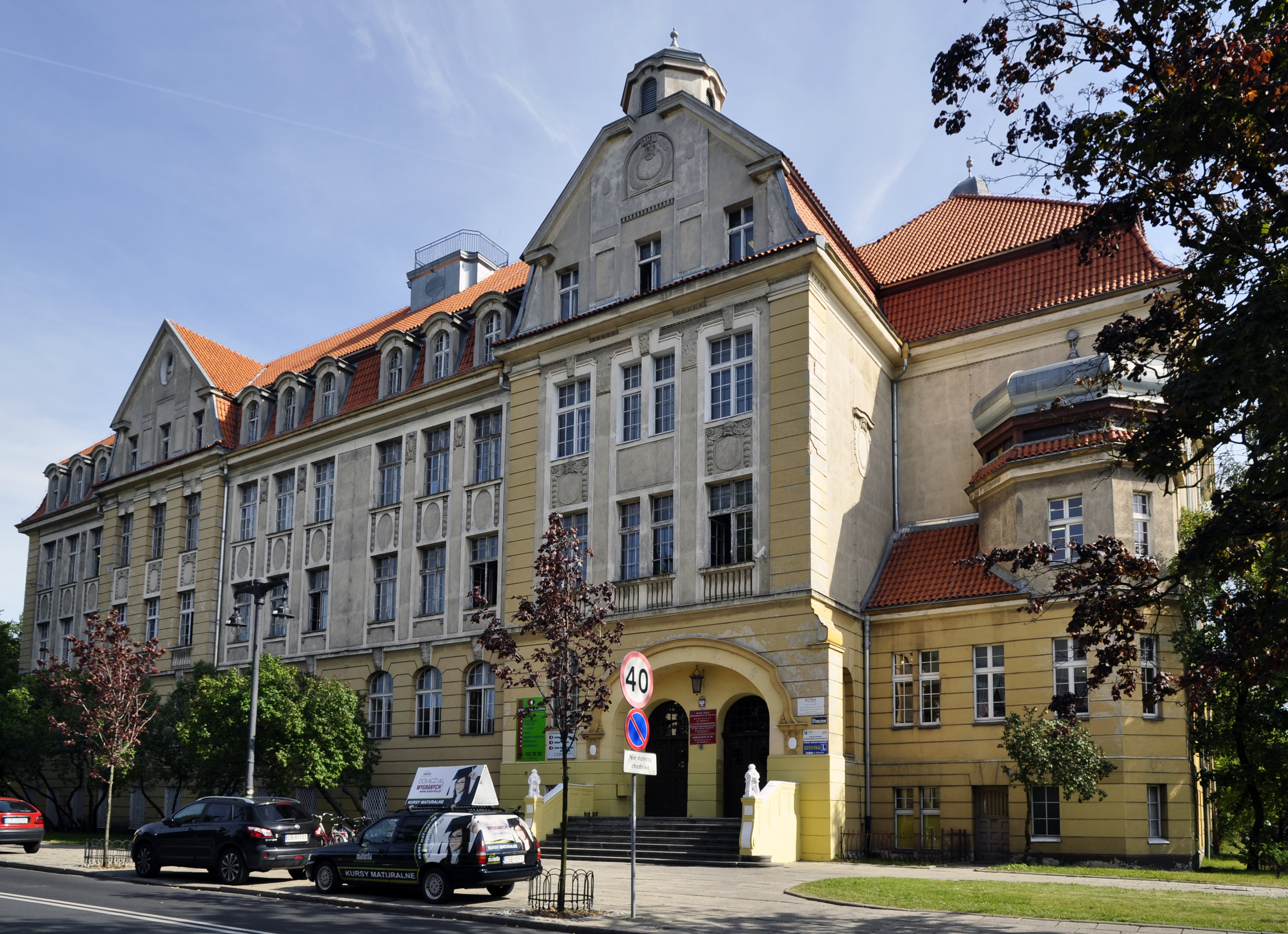
- Interactive map of the Jan and Jędrzej Śniadecki High School Nr.6 in Bydgoszcz area

General information
- Type: High school, Liceum ogólnokształcące
- Architectural style: Eclecticism
- Classification: Nr.601432, reg. A/989, May 28, 1991
- Location: Staszica Street 4, Bydgoszcz, Poland
- Coordinates: 53°7′41″N 18°00′45″E
- Named for: Jan and Jędrzej Śniadecki
- Completed: 1910

High School Nr.6 is a Polish high school in Bydgoszcz, located at Staszic Street 4. The institution is in the vicinity of Ignacy Jan Paderewski Pomeranian Philharmonic building, Bydgoszcz Music Academy - "Feliks Nowowiejski" and the Bydgoszcz Music Schools. No far from High School Nr.6 stand St. Vincent de Paul Basilica and Cyprian Norwid High School Nr.1. The building is registered on the Kuyavian-Pomeranian Voivodeship Heritage List.

Current director is Mrs dr Wiesława Burlińska.

== History ==
=== Creation of the gymnasium ===
This building was built between 1908 and 1910, on the impulse of the City Council of Bromberg, supported financially by the "Bromberg Shipping & Towing Company SA" (German: Bromberger Schleppschiffahrt Aktien Gesellschaft). The firm was very rich and influential in the city business, thanks to the river shipping traffic on Brda and Vistula rivers, having its seat in the LLoyd Palace at Grodzka Street 17.

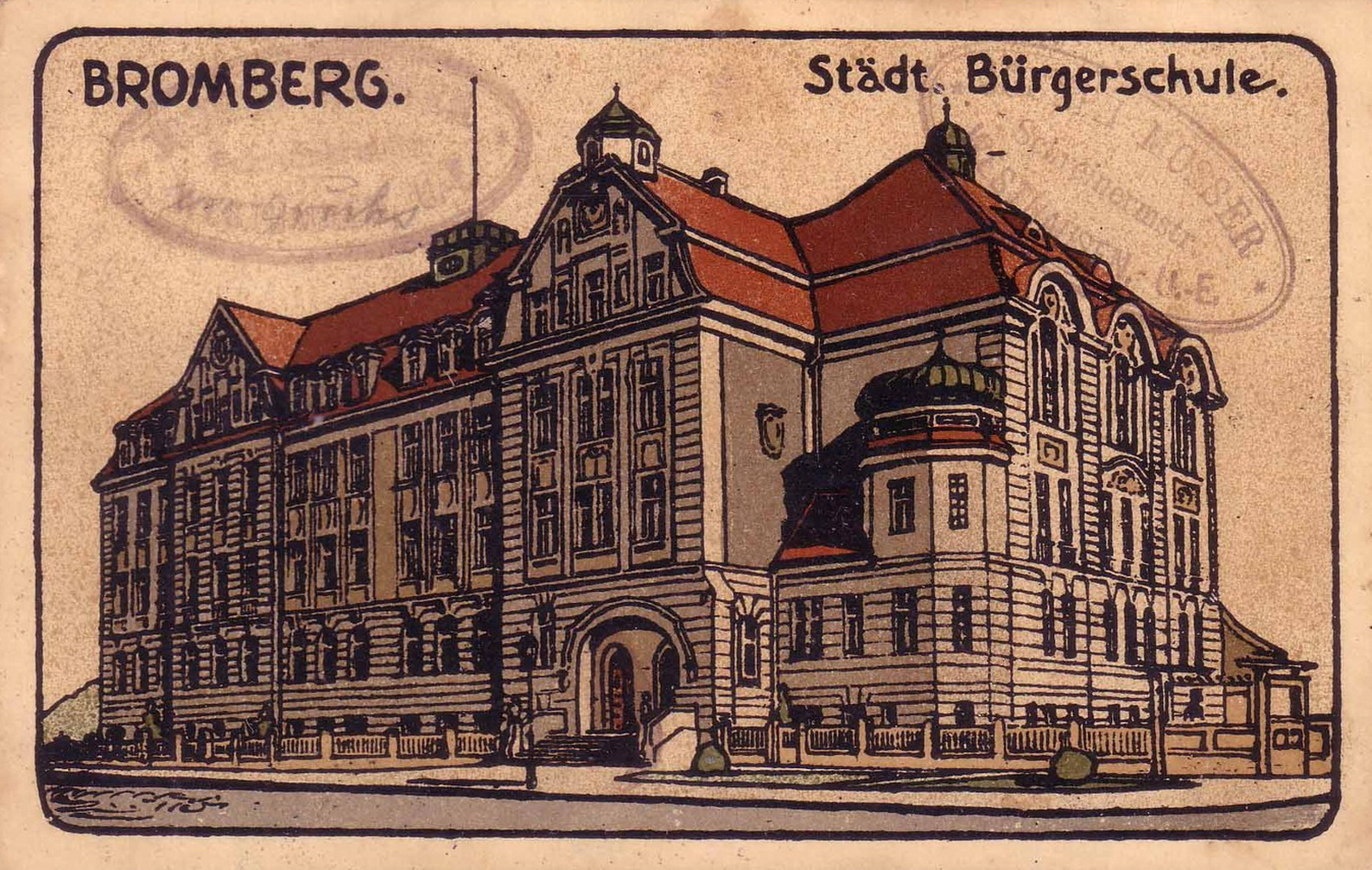
Gymnasium on a 1914 postcard

Carl Meyer, a famous local architect, was asked to design the building. As usual at this time, he delegated the initial project to one of his collaborators, the architect Otto Brech. In Bydgoszcz, Brech also realized the building of School of Applied Arts (1910-1912) at Swiętej Trojcy street 37.

In 1911, the German institution opened at then Braesicke Straße 8/11, first as a Stätische knabenmittelschule (City medium school for boys), then as a Civic School for Boys (German: Bürgerschule).

=== 1920–1939 ===
During this period, the building housed the Humanities High School for girls (Polish: Żeńskie Gimnazjum Humanistyczne) of Bydgoszcz. On March 4, 1922, the school chapel was dedicated and in 1924, first students passed the Matura exam.

Pupils were very active: they established in 1929, an association Summer Colony Society, and a permanent scholarship fund, in order to help their poor colleagues: it resulted in the construction of a holiday house, inaugurated on August 2, 1932. In May 1934, students edited a school magazine, "Girls in Uniform".

From 1931 till the onset of WWII, Marian Turwid had been teaching drawing and arts there.

=== WWII ===
The edifice sheltered several institutions:

- in 1939, a Polish primary school (few months)
- a German school during the occupation
- in 1945, a military hospital

=== Post war period ===
In September 1945, the building was taken over by the Municipal Secondary School.

High School Nr.6 was established September 1, 1948. Initially located at Olszewskieko street 20, (today Kordeckiego street), it moved in August 1950, to the current building at Staszica street 4. The newly school was the first in the region created by the Society of Friends of Children, a non-governmental association leading benefit activities for children (est. 1919). It was a year school for students from years 7 to 18.

In 1950, associated with its move to new premises, the school changed its name to VI Gymnasium and High School. In 1958, the Ministry of Education approved its patron name, Jan and Jędrzej Śniadecki, and its banner. From the middle of the 1960s, the institution turned exclusively to High school curricula. In September 1973, only High School Nr.6 remained in the building.

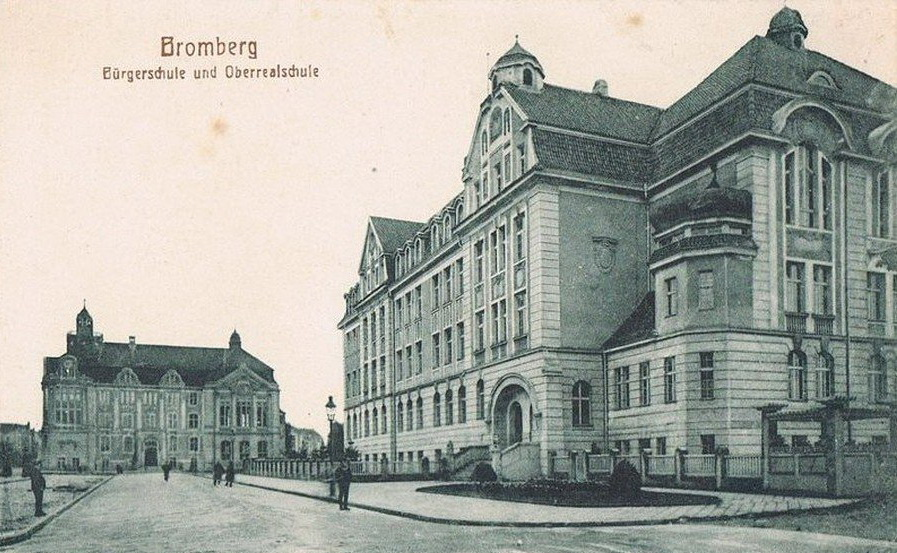
1915, the lyceum and the Copernicanum

=== Since 1990 ===
Most important developments of the facility took place in the 1990s. On December 6, 1991 High School Nr.6 was admitted to the Society of Creative Schools (Polish: Towarzystwo Szkół Twórczych-TST), an educational reforming movement born in the 1980s at High School Nr.40 in Warsaw. It links today 30 high schools across Poland.

The terms of reference of the TST association imposed the implementation by High School Nr.6 VI LO of several rules, among which:

- adopting innovation and organizational program developed by the TST;
- having an educational program, both urban and rural;
- organizing a club Promoting Talents and a Creative Teachers' Club;
- opening grade "0" classes teaching in German;
- developing an active participation of the teaching staff, and especially the director, in the work of the Creative Schools Association;
- dissemination of TST teaching innovations in the region of Bydgoszcz.

Since the 1990s, the High School Nr.6 trusts high rankings in Polish competitions (and UNESCO's, Olympiads). Almost every year, it occupies the second place in the regional ranking and the first place in Bydgoszcz.

In 1999 was established the Gimnazjum Nr.50, as an institution within the High School Nr.6, and three years later (2002) the High School Ensemble Nr.6 (Polish: Zespół Szkół Ogólnokształcących (ZS) nr 6) was established, associating both institutions.

For school year 2007–2008, ZSO nr 6 opened "academic" classes, teamed with University of Technology and Life Sciences in Bydgoszcz. On December 21, 2009, the rector of Kazimierz Wielki University in Bydgoszcz (UKW) signed a cooperation agreement to create another academic class with ZSO nr 6.

Classes of the Junior High School, focused on sciences (mathematics, informatics, natural sciences) participate in activities conducted by researchers of the University. Gradually, ZSO nr6 became an institution geared towards science subjects.

Another innovative idea was the creation, in 2010/2011, of interdisciplinary classes in small groups ("Clubs") on Edward de Bono's concept. They coexisted with four other clubs: Economics, Humanities, Mathematics and Sciences, realizing cross-curricular activities. Those classes in clubs, developed in collaboration with UKW Department of Psychology, are thought to develop creativity, critical thinking and improve problem-solving skills.

In school year 2015–2016, a polytechnic class was created, focusing on mathematics, physics and computer science, in cooperation with Nicolaus Copernicus University in Toruń (Polish: Uniwersytet Mikołaja Kopernika w Toruniu, UMK), Gdańsk and Universities of Technology.

ZSO nr 6 keeps promoting its educational offer in relation with scientific institutions in the region, such as:

- UKW Institute of Mechanics and Applied Informatics (in Copernicanum building);
- The Faculty of Physics, Astronomy and Applied Computer Science of Nicolaus Copernicus University in Toruń;
- The Faculty of Medicine Ludwik Rydygier in Bydgoszcz.

The aim is to enable students to develop skills of creative research in scientific fields.

== Activities ==
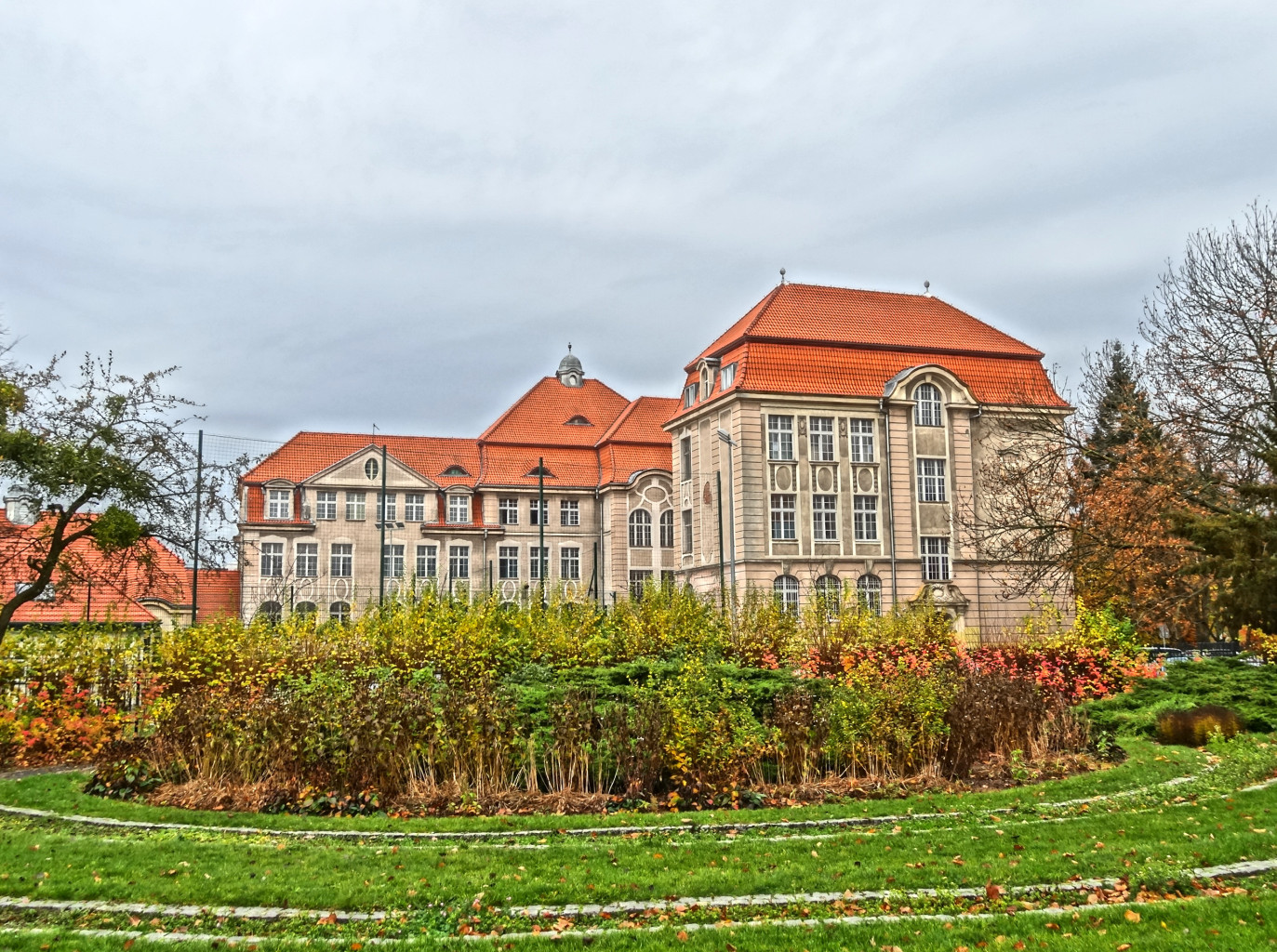
View from Kopernika Street

High School Nr.6 is a member of the eTwinning community of schools. eTwinning is an initiative of the European Commission aiming to encourage European schools to collaborate using Information and Communication Technologies (ICT) by providing the necessary infrastructure (online tools, services, support) to teaching staff.

Teachers regularly take part to the Erasmus + programme. In 2015/2016, 18 members of the staff travelled in Europe to broaden their knowledge and hone their skills.

Every year, students get prepared for International Science Olympiads in 20 different topics, with recurring success.

In addition, pupils take part to various competitions, such as

- KFA Klaps, a national contest of amateurs films;
- Chemical contest for first classes of High School;
- Konkursy Kuratora Oświaty dla Gimnazjalistów for High School students;
- "Struggles with genetics" - for High school first grade;
- Musketeers of words.

== Notable alumni ==
- Adrianna Biedrzyńska, actress;
- Zbigniew Boniek, former footballer and manager and current head of the Polish Football Association;
- Rafał Bruski, politician, current mayor of Bydgoszcz (since 2010);
- Jan Kulczyk, businessman and entrepreneur;
- Tomasz Latos, politician, member of the Polish parliament (since 2005);
- Camilla Mondral (1922), daughter of Karol Mondral.

== Architecture ==
The footprint of the ZSO nr6 occupies an entire block, between the following streets: Staszica, Lucjana Szenwalda, Kopernika and Władysława Reymonta. The plot comprises the building itself, but also outdoor sporting facilities (e.g. basketball and football pitches).

The main building has a L shape, with its main facade giving onto Staszica street. The edifice displays late Eclectic features and is registered since 1992 on the Kuyavian-Pomeranian Voivodeship heritage list. It is often associated with the neighbouring Copernicanum building, erected a few years earlier (1905-1906), also focused on pedagogical purposes.

The 4-storey elevation on Staszica street presents two avant-corps topped with both different gables. On the right, the main entrance is accessible via a few stairs, flanked by two hand rails adorned with sculpted festooned urns. The arche shaped portal boasts round shape transom lights. At street level, openings are round-topped, with a bulging corner stone. Upper floors display balustrades on the avant-corps, separated by festoon motifs from the level above. The latter is crowned by garland decoration and bossage pediments. The last level is set up in the Mansard roof, pierced by many dormer. On the top of the roof stands an observation terrace, and a massive ridge turret crowns the right avant-corps.

At the corner of the edifice, wedged between the two wings, stands a modest building, presenting a modest turret ended by a tented roof onion dome.

The elevation on Władysława Reymonta street displays a first part as rich as the other facade, especially with three peak windows on the last floor, enriched with large floral motifs pediments. This piece is also topped by a ridge turret. Other building fractions along the street are less massive, with less architectural details. They house, among others, the gym hall.

Interiors decoration comprises pillars, friezes, stuccoes, vault arches and a large examination hall.

== Gallery ==
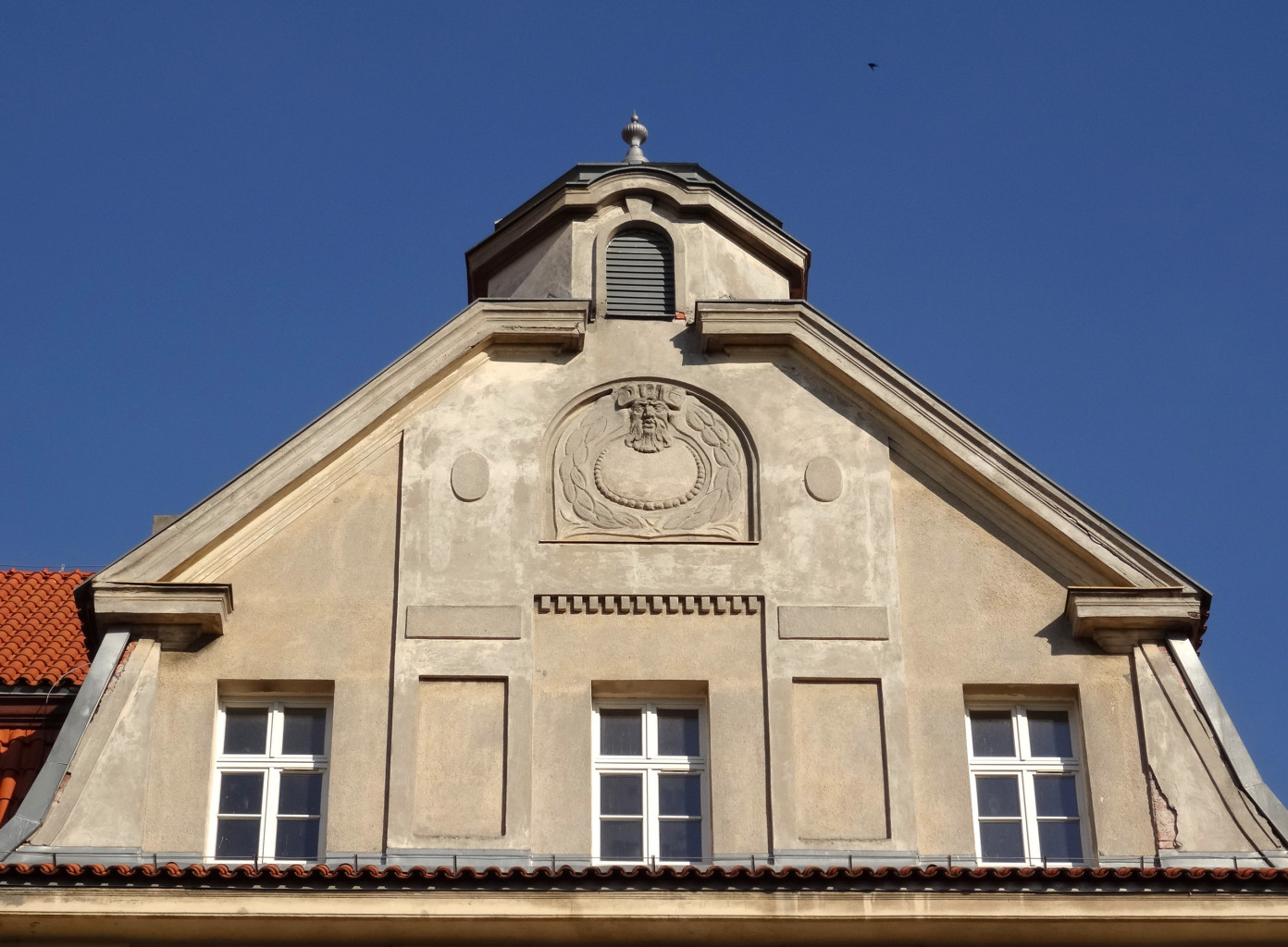
Detail of a gable top

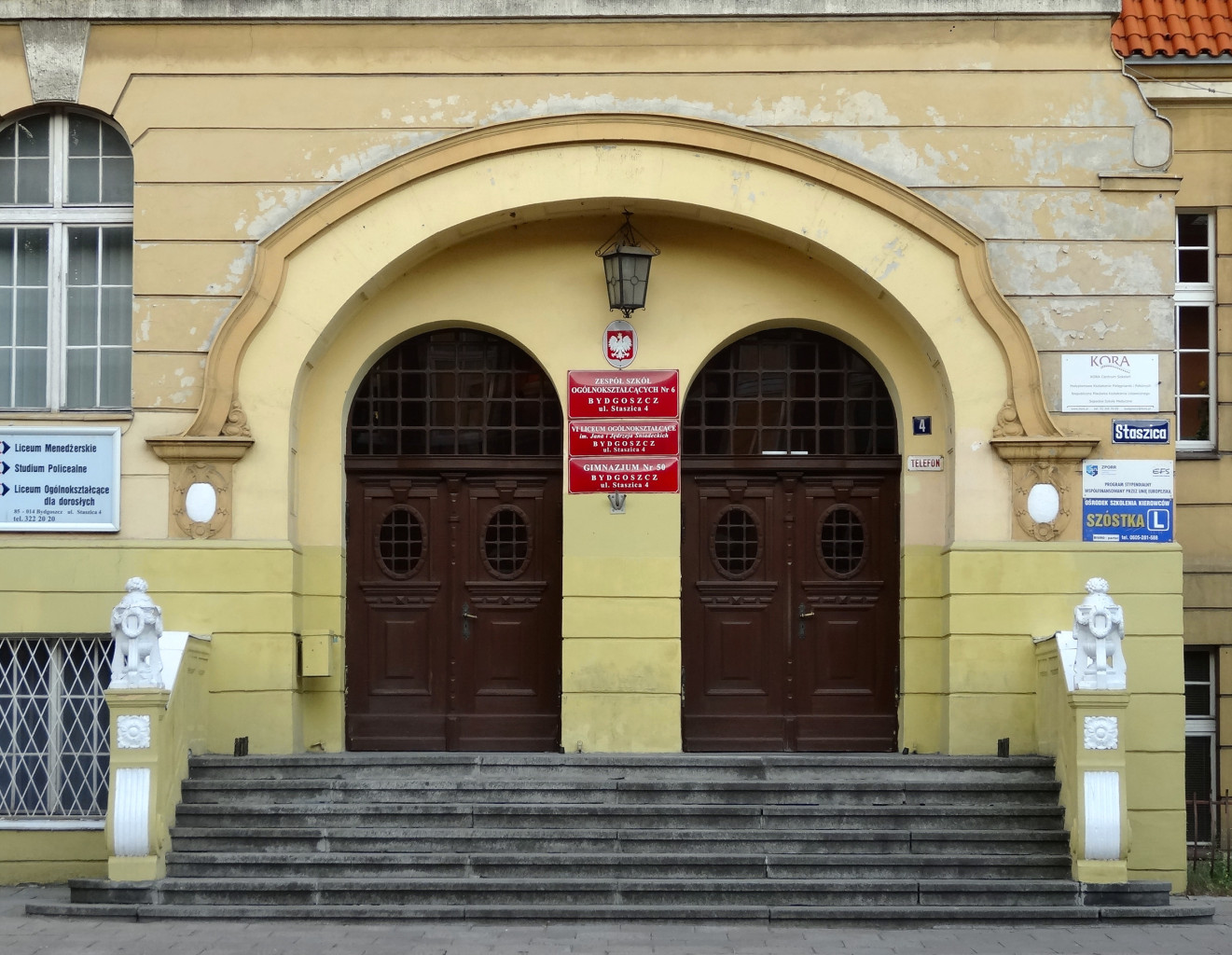
Portal

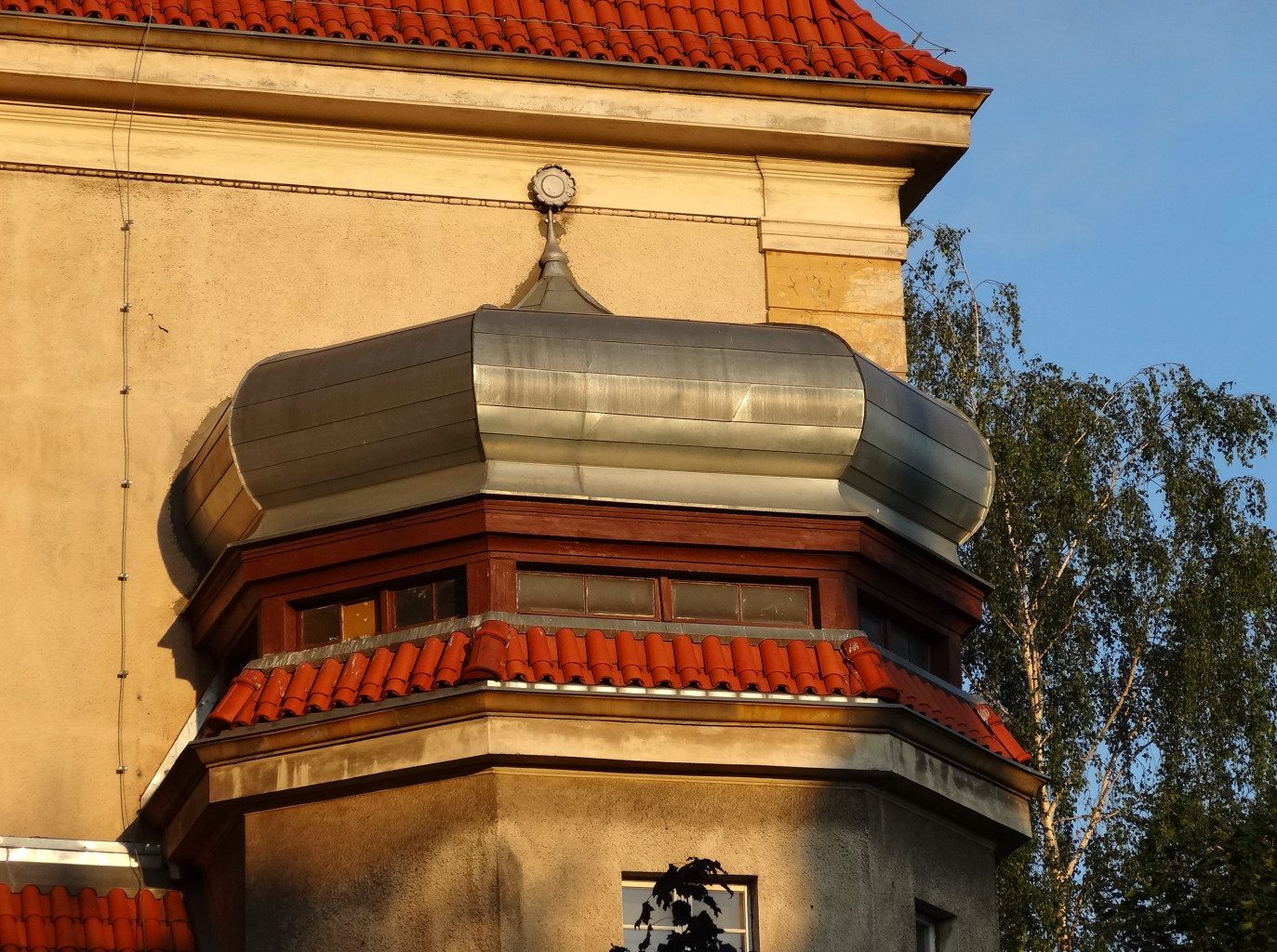
Detail of the onion dome

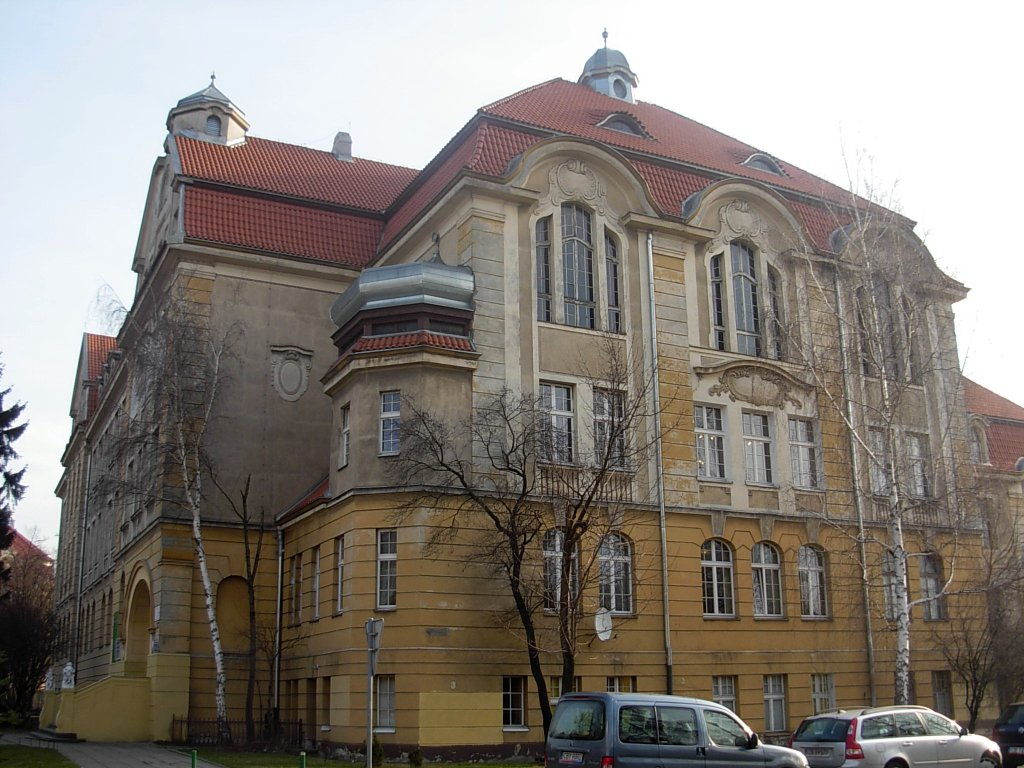
Facade on Reymonda Street

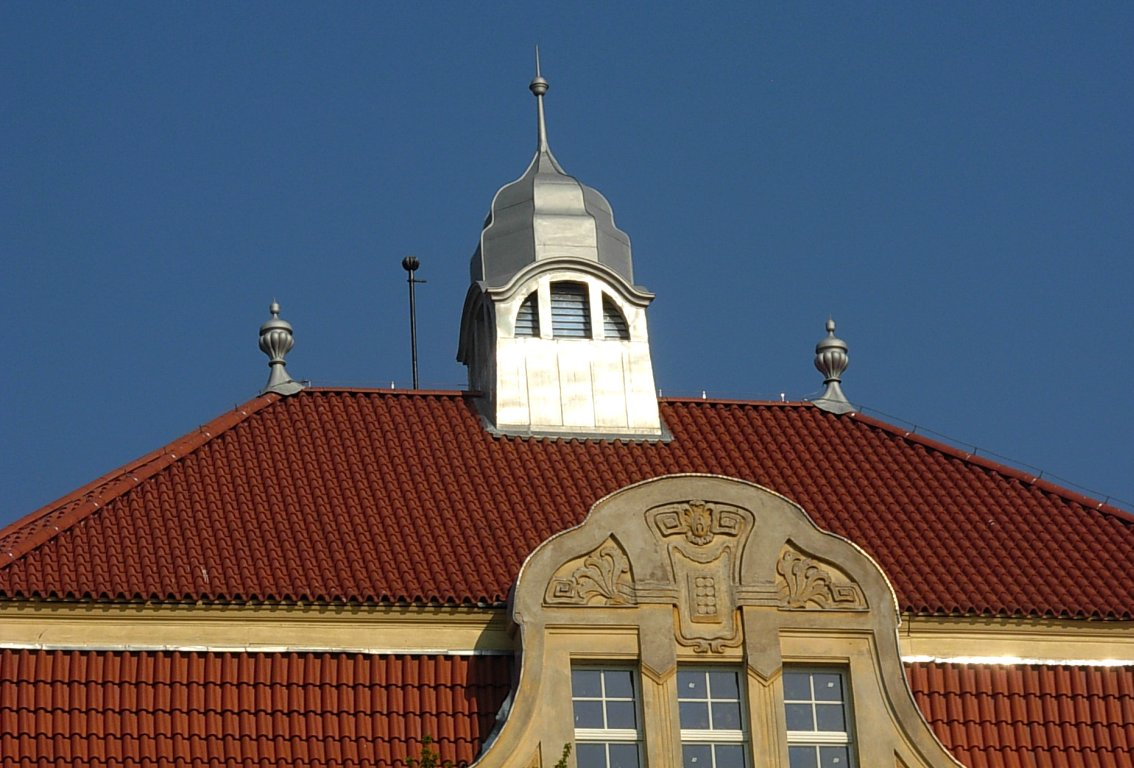
Detail of a ridge turret

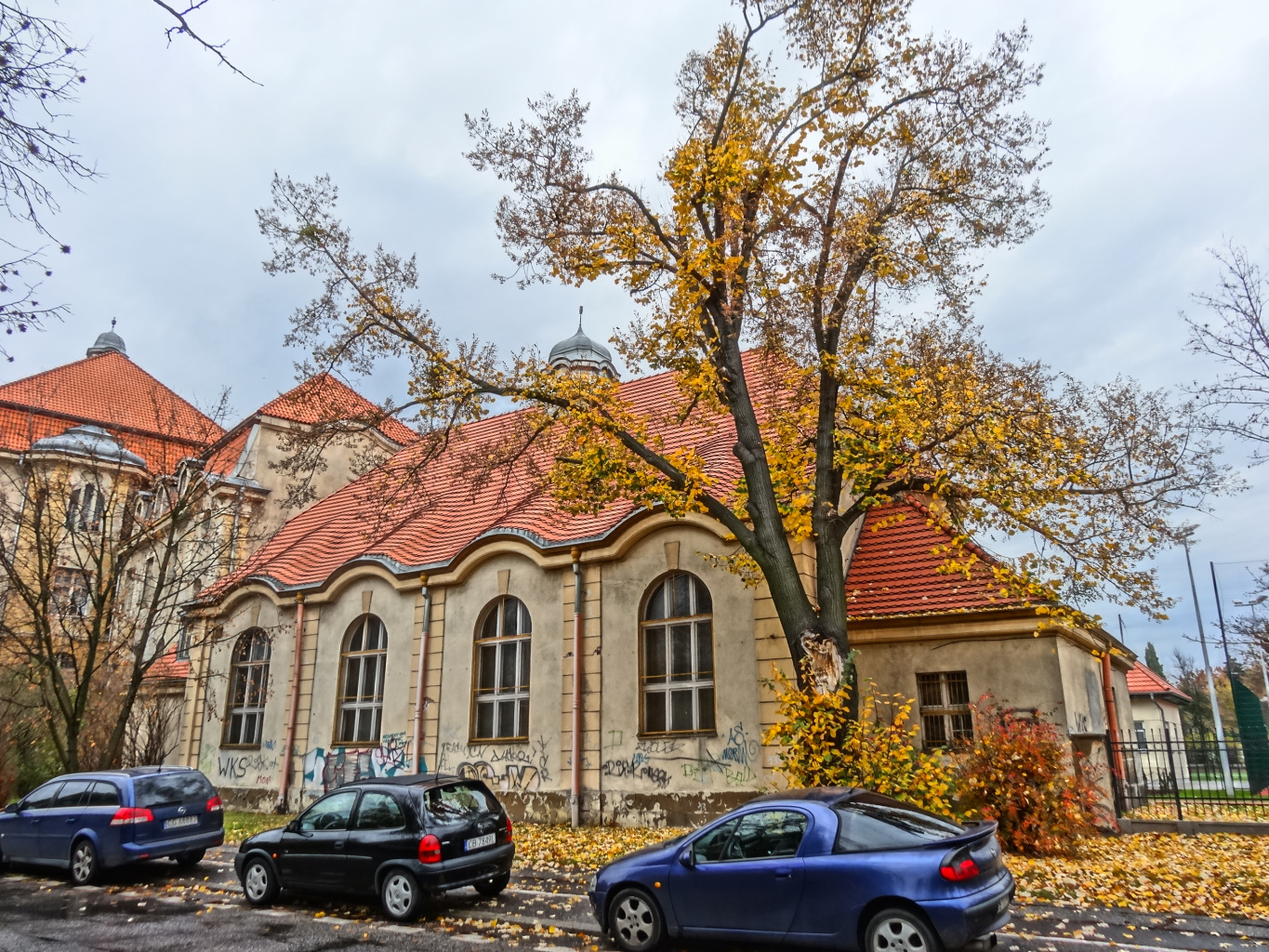
Gym hall

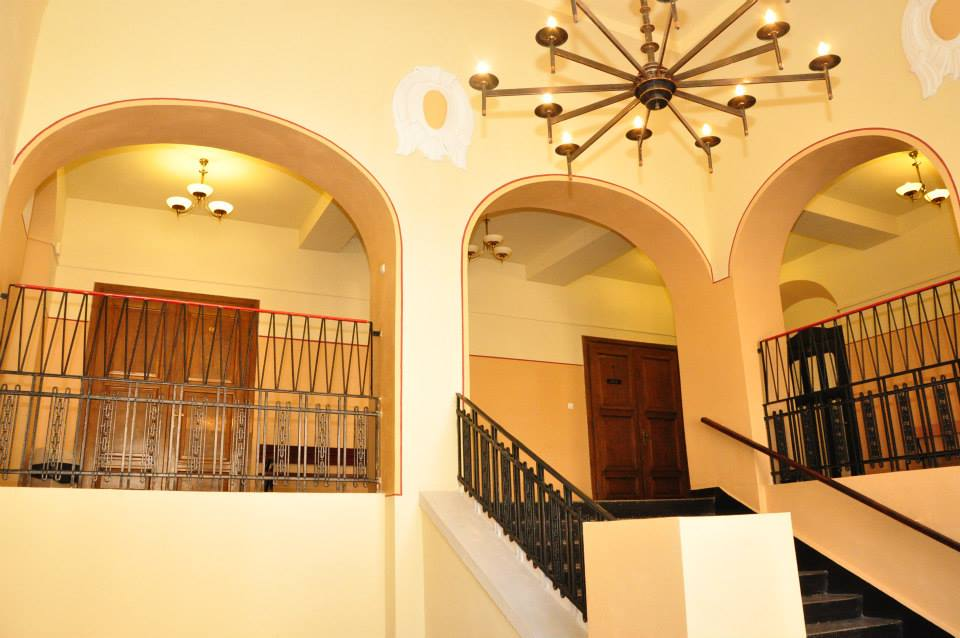
Interiors, main staircase

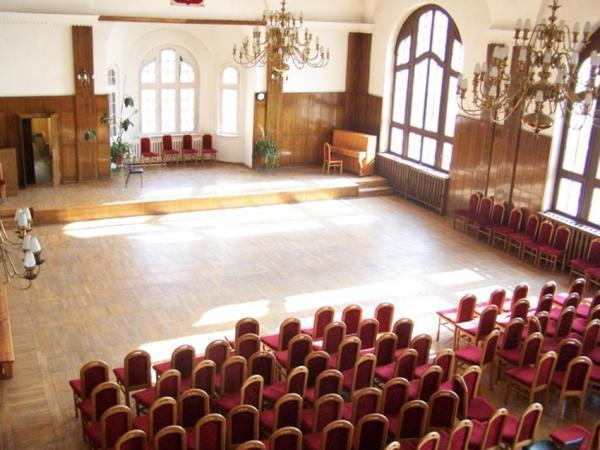
Main Hall

== See also ==
- Bydgoszcz
- Staszica and Paderewskiego Streets in Bydgoszcz
- Copernicanum building in Bydgoszcz
- Kołłątaja street in Bydgoszcz
- Kopernika Street in Bydgoszcz
- High School No. 1, Bydgoszcz
- St. Vincent de Paul Basilica Minor in Bydgoszcz
- Bydgoszcz Music Academy - "Feliks Nowowiejski"
- Music Schools Group in Bydgoszcz
