= Copernicanum =

- Polish: Copernicanum w Bydgoszczy
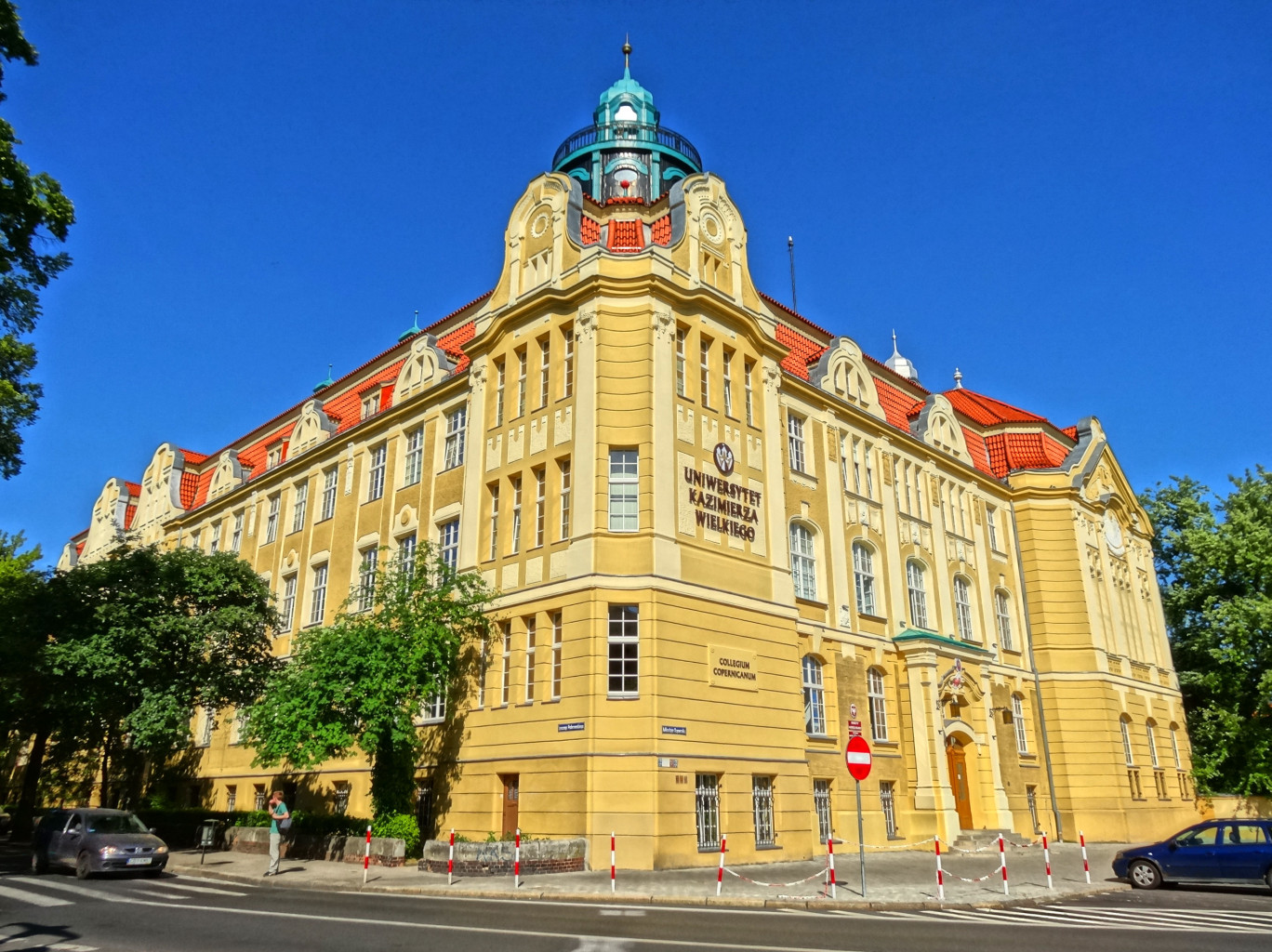
- View from street intersection

General information
- Type: Gymnasium (school)
- Architectural style: Art Nouveau
- Classification: Nr.601363, Reg. A/784 (May 5, 1992)
- Location: 1 Kopernika Street, Bydgoszcz, Poland
- Coordinates: 53°7′44″N 18°00′45″E
- Groundbreaking: 1905
- Completed: 1906
- Client: UKW in Bydgoszcz

Technical details
- Floor count: 5

Design and construction
- Architect(s): Carl Zaar & Rudolf Vahl

The Copernicanum is a historical building in downtown Bydgoszcz, which had been designed as a scholar building: initially a realschule, it then took the purpose of a city sciences high school and technical railway institutions. Registered on the Kuyavian-Pomeranian Voivodeship Heritage List, it is nowadays the location of a junior high school.

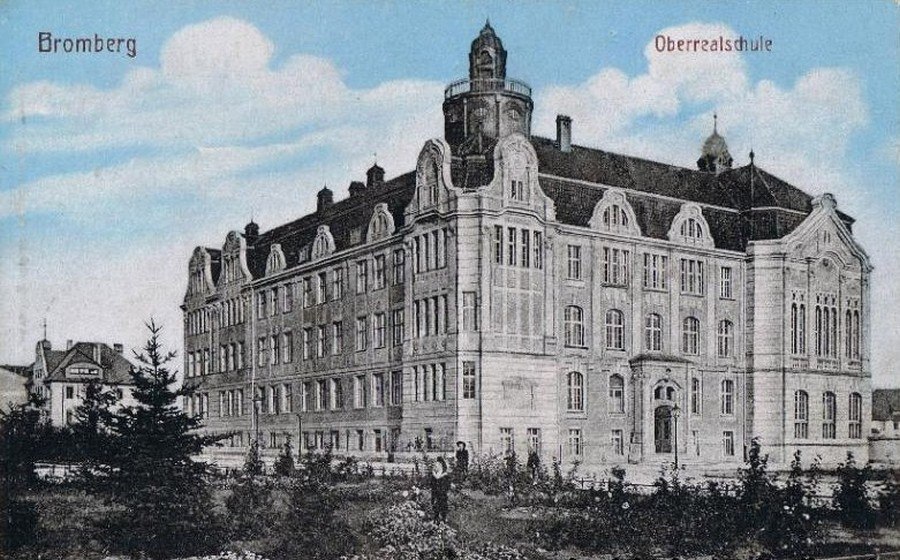
Copernicanum, 1910

In 1923, to celebrate the 450th anniversary of the birth of Nicolaus Copernicus, the newly created junior high school adopted his name, Copernicanum.

== History ==
In the beginning of the 20th century, Prussian authorities of Bromberg decided to have a realschule built on the outskirts of then city downtown.

The commissioned architects, Carl Zaar and Rudolf Vahl, had just completed together in 1901 the Słupsk Town Hall in the nearby Prussian Province of Pomerania within the German Empire. Carl Zaar (Köln, 1849-Berlin 1924), was a pupil of architect Julius Carl Raschdorff, one of the leading German architects of the second half of the 19th century. He was a supporter of German historicism and designed the Berlin Cathedral. Rudolf Vahl had a construction engineer background and came from Berlin.

In the late 1910s, the wing onto Paderewskiego street has been rebuilt. The building housed the city realschule from its inception till October 15, 1921, when it housed the Polish Municipal High School of Mathematics and Natural Sciences (Polish: Miejskie Gimnazjum Męskie Matematyki i nauki przyrodnicze), then at Paderewskiego street. The edifice housed in 1925, the Municipal Music Institute, newly established, and headed by the Poznań pianist Zygmunt Lisicki. In the 1930s, it became a High school for boys, Polish: Miejskie Gimnazjum Męskie.

During Nazi occupation, the building served, among others, as a military hospital. After the war, the edifice housed vocational schools:

- The Technical school of the Posts and Telegraphs Ministry;
- The Technical railway school - School Group Nr.13 Polish: Zespół Szkół nr 13, which was disbanded in August 2007.

Since 2005, the Copernicanum building has been the property of Bydgoszcz University, or UKW Polish: Uniwersytet Kazimierza Wielkiego. Between 2005 and 2007, heavy restoration works, including upgrades to current standards, were performed over the facility, allowing UKW to house the Institute of Mechanics and Applied Informatics, Polish: Instytut Mechaniki i Informatyki Stosowanej.

== Architecture ==
=== Exteriors ===
The edifice has an L-shaped footprint boasting Art Nouveau style, registered on the Kuyavian-Pomeranian Voivodeship Heritage List. Architectural details flourished on both facades of the building: pilasters, motifs, ornaments, festoons are everywhere to be seen.

==== Facade on Kopernika Street ====
The elevation of the facade on Kopernika Street displays two avant-corps on its extremities. The left one, bearing a large sundial, houses long and tall windows of the main hall. It is adorned on the top with owl shapes -symbol of knowledge- flanking a decorative stucco ribbon, crowned by the date of completion of the edifice (1906). The left avant-corps, although less majestic, is topped by a large round observation tower overhanging the mansard roofs.

The massive portal, flanked by pilasters, displays a curved transom ornamented with stucco ribbon motifs. On top of the transom light are visible Bydgoszcz and Poland coats of arm.

==== Facade on Paderewskiego Street ====
This frontage, albeit less decorated, offers more uniformity as far as architectural details are concerned. Facade shows high openings at each floor, topped by dormers with various shape: kernel, semi-circular with pediment or even grand ogee model. One can also make out some decorative rosettes.

==== Backyard ====
In the backyard of the building grow two large silver maples (330 and 430 cm diameter), identified as Natural landmarks of Bydgoszcz.

=== Interiors ===
In addition of all the renovated class and experiment/technical rooms, a refurbished concert hall has been unveiled in 2010. Comprising a recording studio, it is at the disposal of the Institute of Music Education. The concert hall, originally an assembly room, still displays two preserved and restored large chandeliers and original floors.

== Gallery ==
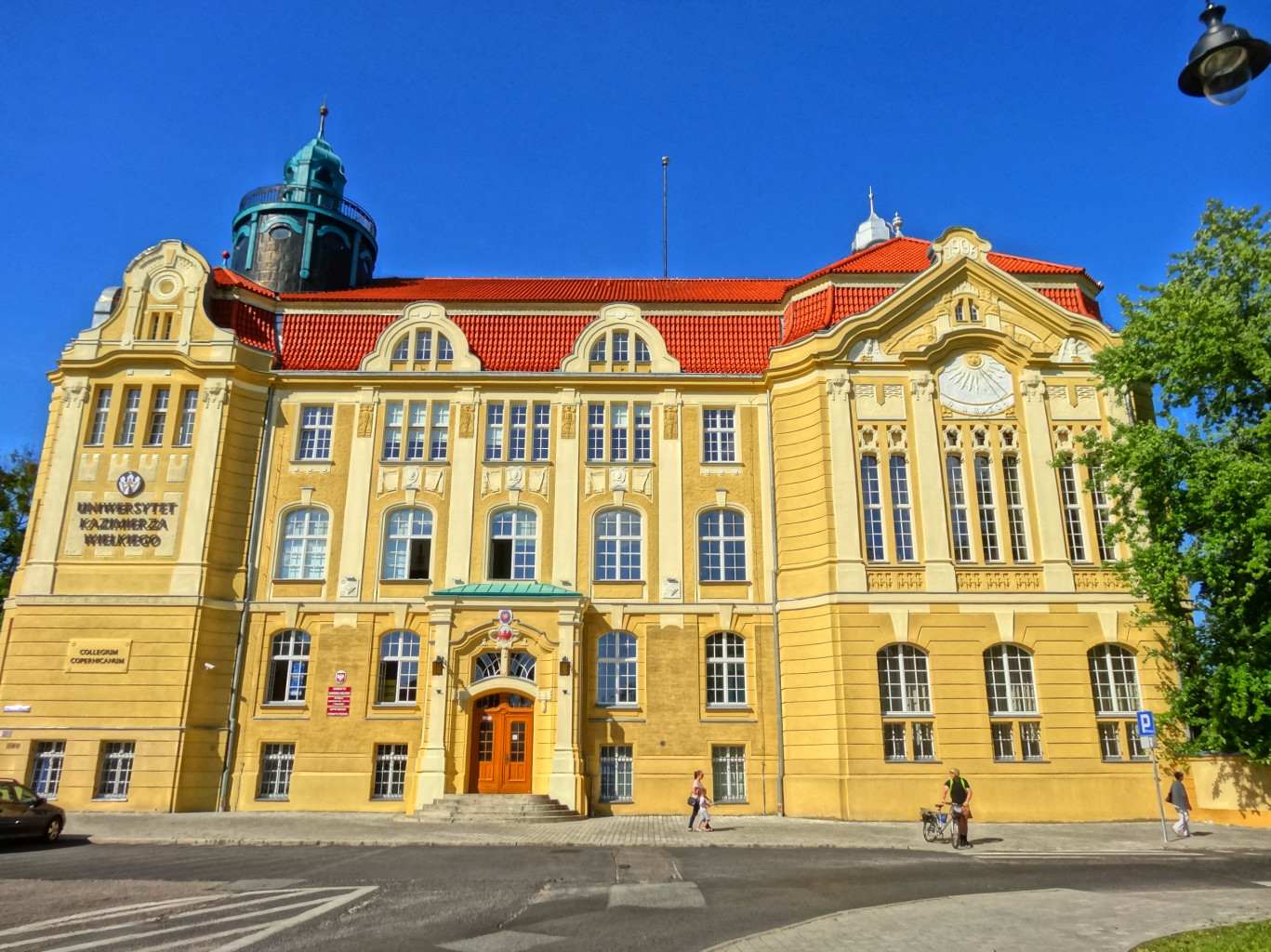
Facade onto Kopernika Street

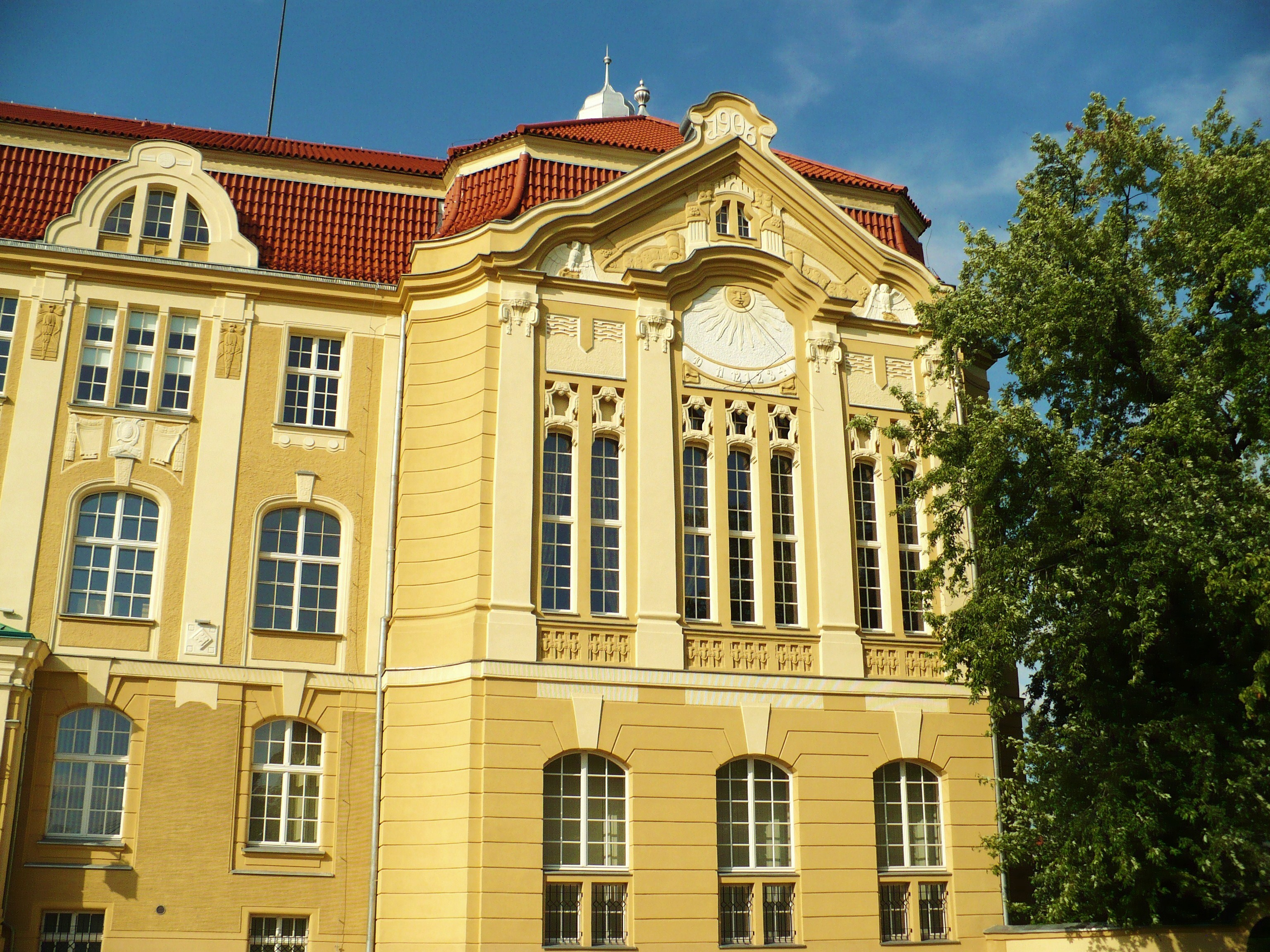
Right avant-corps

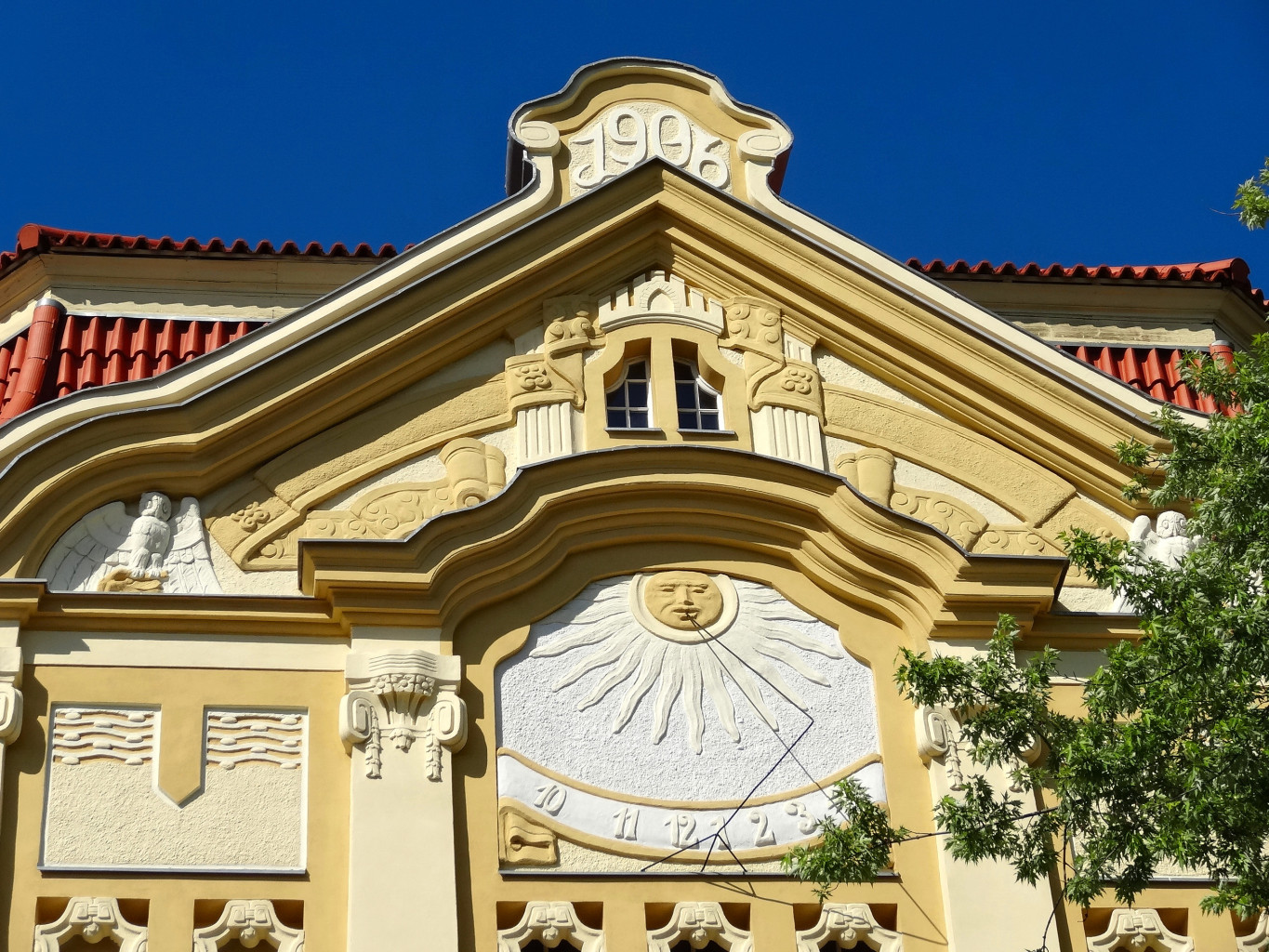
Detail of the sundial

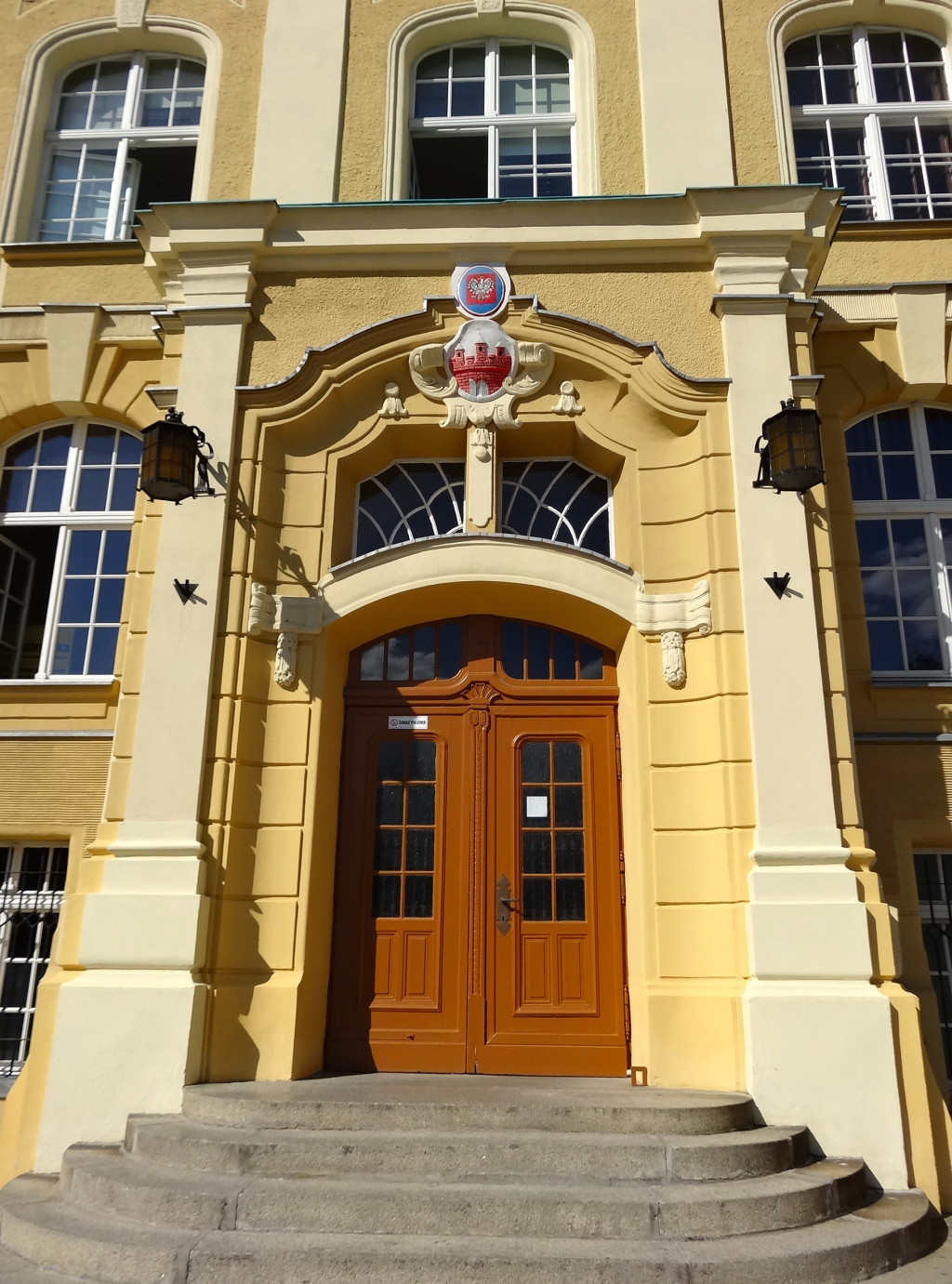
Main portal

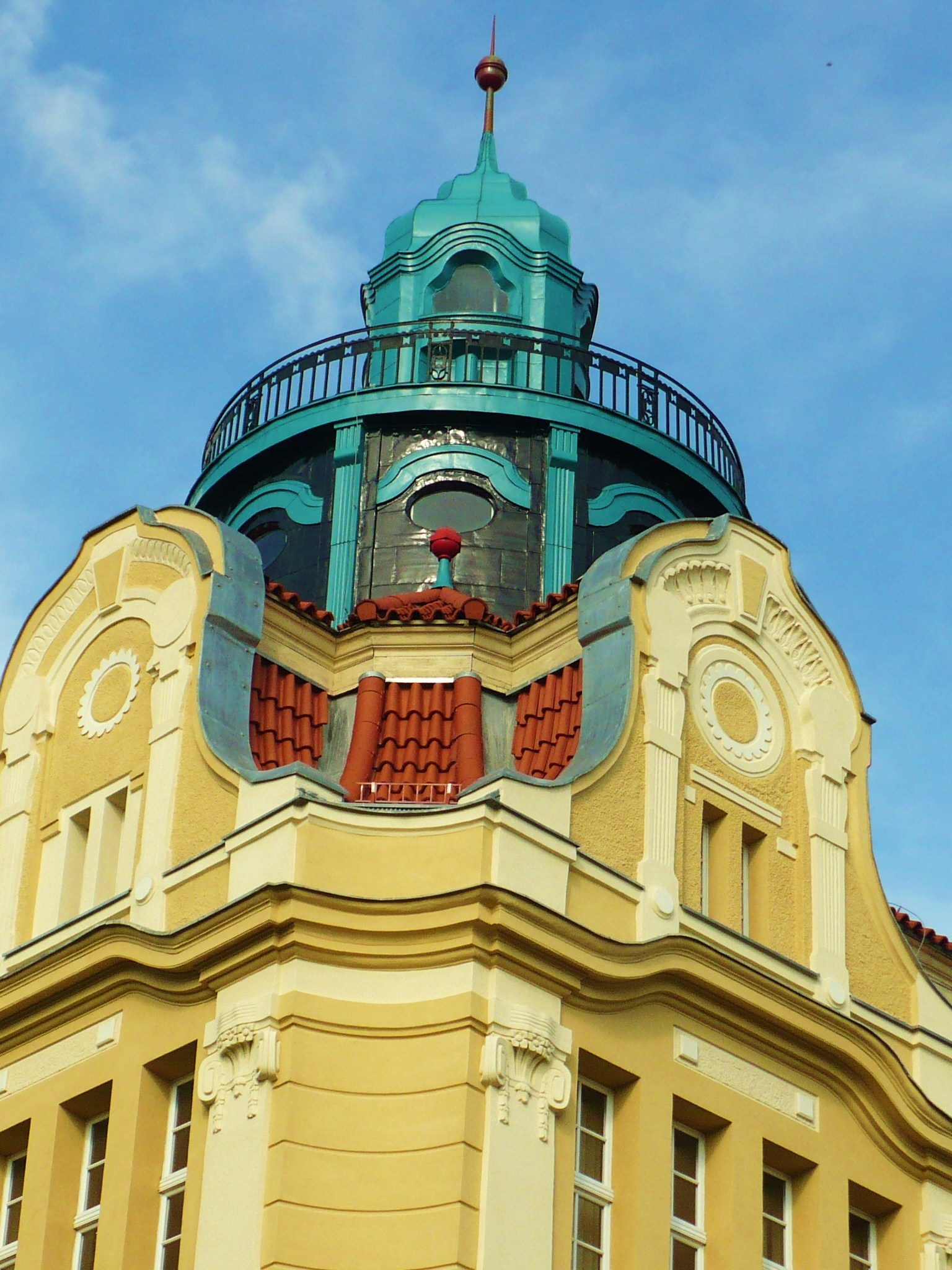
Observation tower

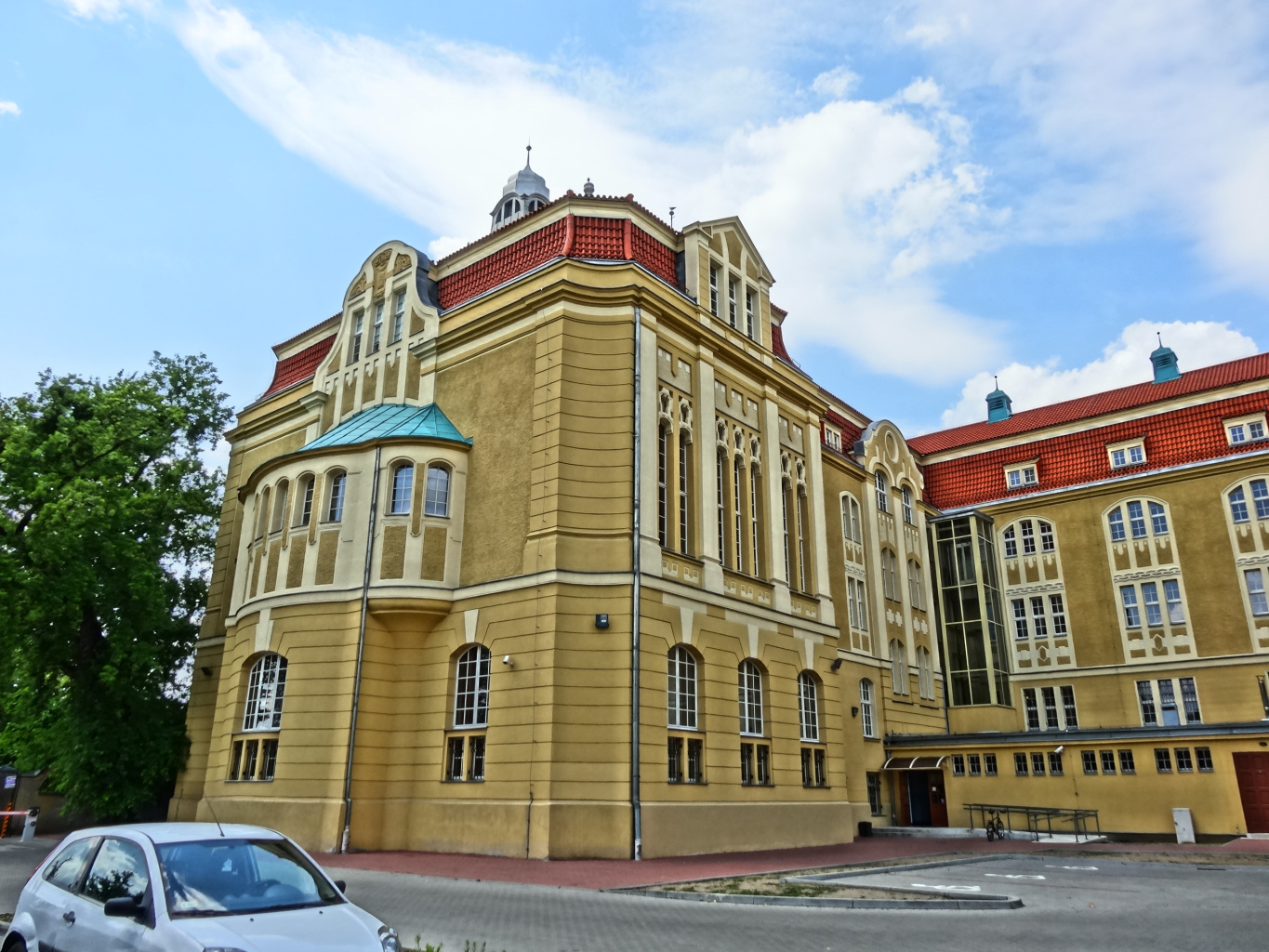
View from the backyard

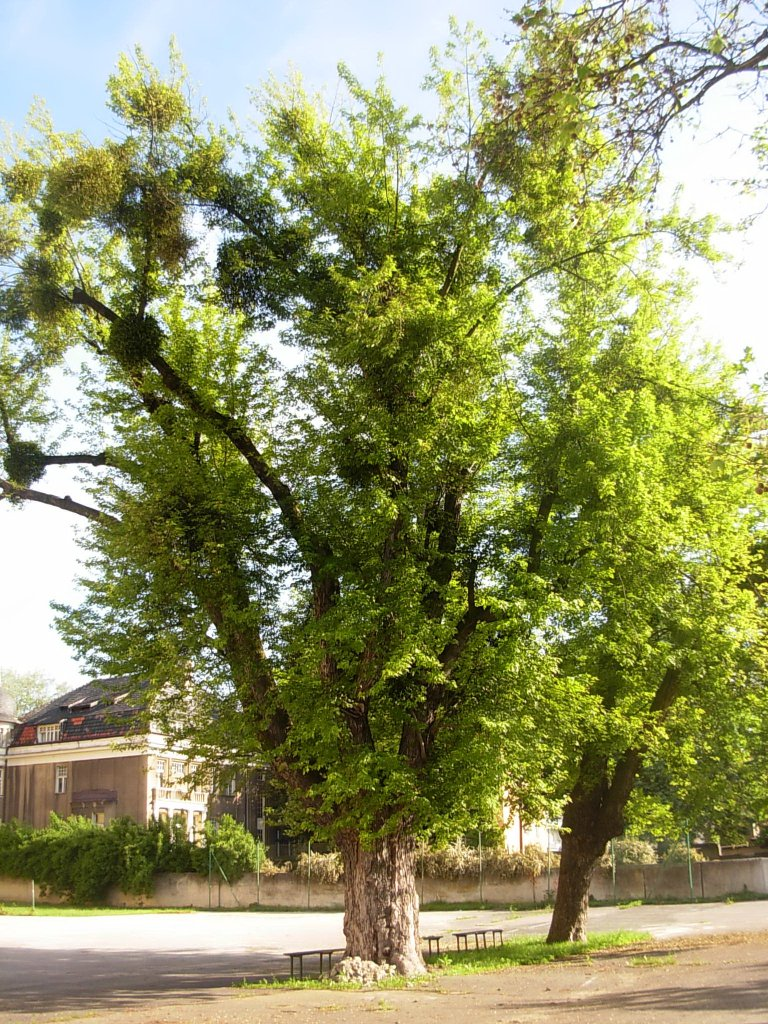
First silver maple, Bydgoszcz Natural monument

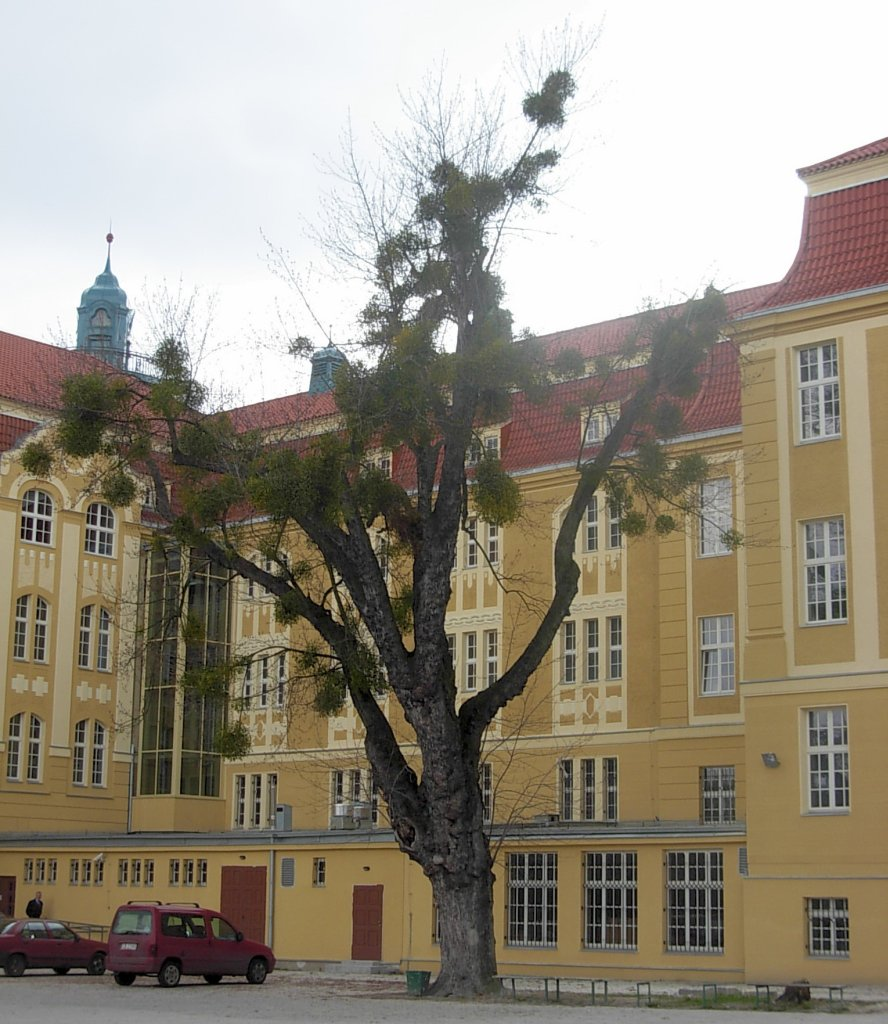
Second silver maple, Bydgoszcz Natural monument

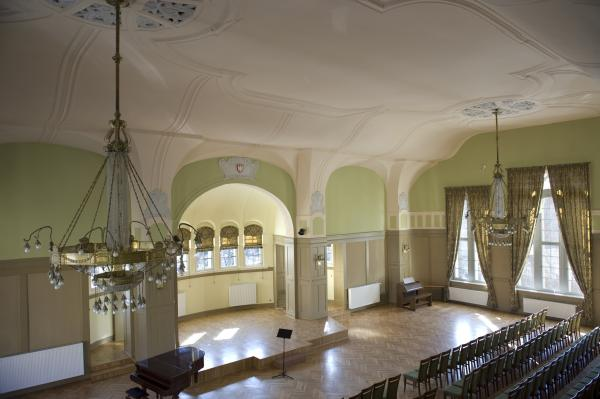
Concert hall

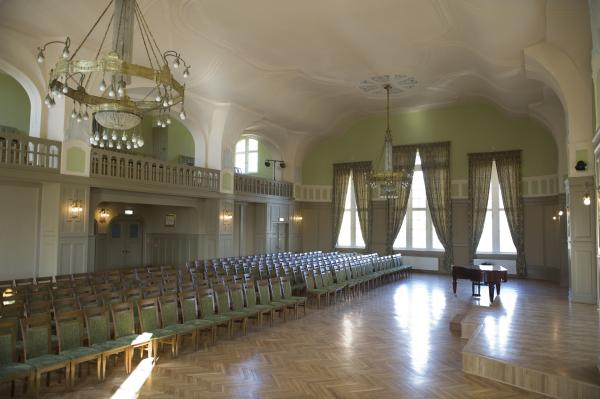
Concert hall

== See also ==
- Bydgoszcz
- Kopernika Street in Bydgoszcz
- Pomeranian Philharmonic
- Ossoliński Alley
- Adam Mickiewicz Alley
- Kołłątaja street in Bydgoszcz
- High School No. 6, Bydgoszcz
- (in Polish) Natural Monuments in Bydgoszcz

== Bibliography ==
- (in Polish) Kaczmarczyk, Henryk (1971). Wspomnienia o Bydgoskim "Koperniku". Kalendarz Bydgoski. Bydgoszcz: Towarzystwo Miłośników Miasta Bydgoszczy. pp. 191–192.
