= Konstanty Brandel =

Polish painter and graphic artist

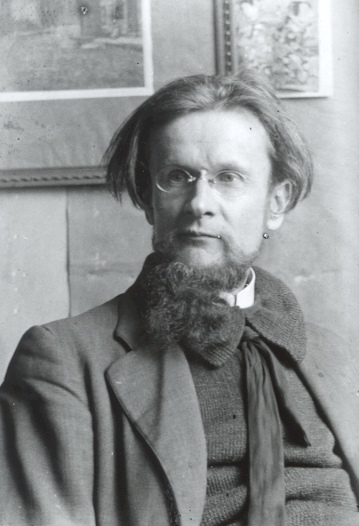
Konstanty Brandel

Konstanty Brandel (1880–1970) was a Polish painter and graphic artist. He is a notable contributor to the Young Poland movement.

He studied at the Académie Vitti in Paris.
