= Mechanical School No. 1, Bydgoszcz =

Building in Bydgoszcz, Poland

Mechanical School Nr.1 Franciszek Sylwester Jerzy Siemiradzki
- Polish: Budynek Zespołu Szkół Mechanicznych w Bydgoszczy
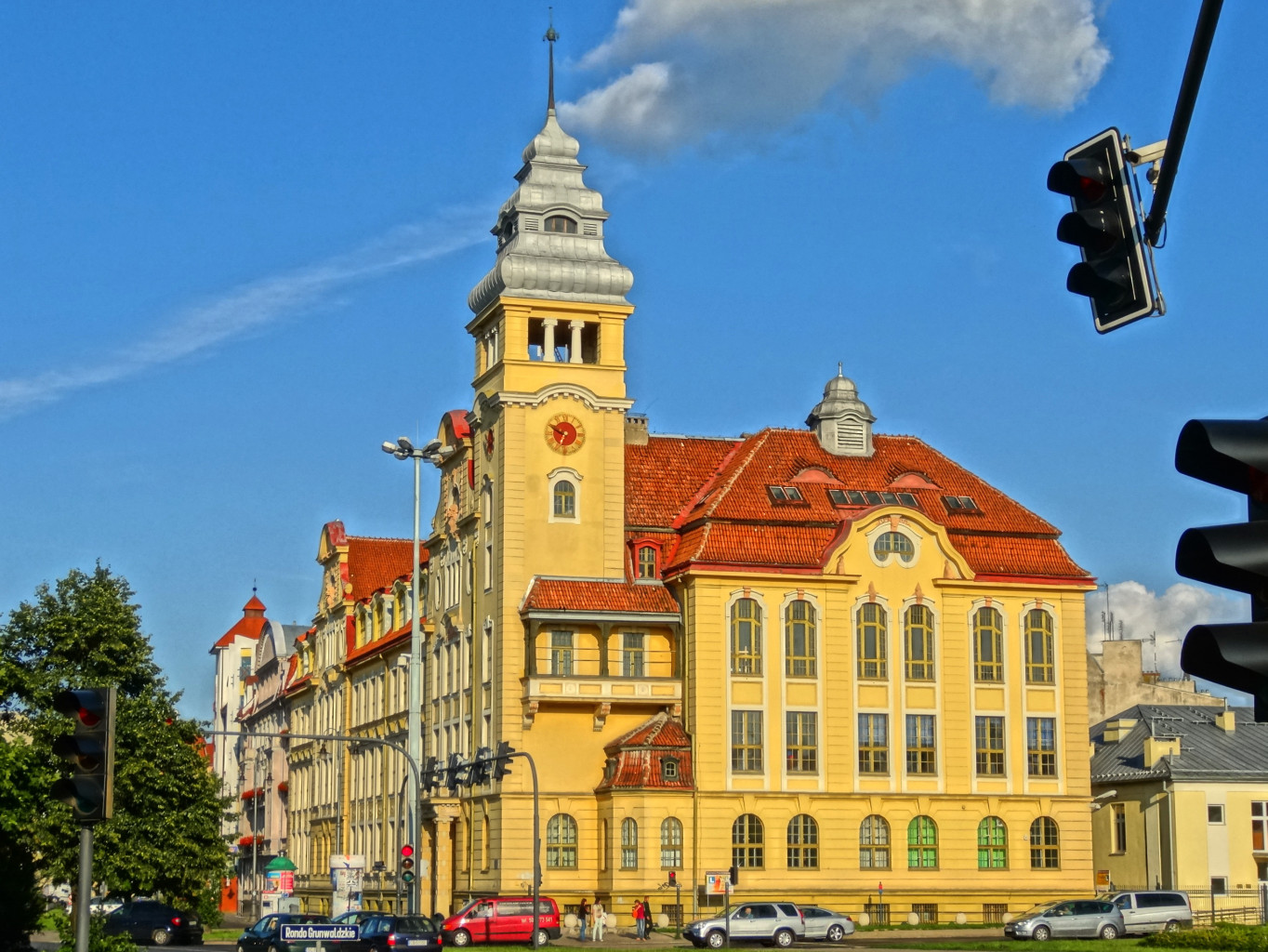
- View of the building from Focha Street
- Interactive map of the Mechanical School Nr.1 Franciszek Sylwester Jerzy Siemiradzki area

General information
- Architectural style: Eclecticism in architecture, Neo-Baroque
- Classification: Nr.601424, Reg. A/890, March 23, 1993
- Location: 37 Świętej Trójcy Street, Bydgoszcz, Poland
- Coordinates: 53°7′30″N 17°59′13″E
- Current tenants: Mechanical School
- Named for: Franciszek Siemiradzki
- Construction started: 1910
- Completed: 1911
- Client: Royal-Prussian School of Craft and Art Industry

Technical details
- Floor count: 4

Design and construction
- Architects: Otto Brech, Carl Meyer

The building of the Mechanical School in Bydgoszcz is a historic public edifice, serving educational purposes, located at 37 Świętej Trójcy Street, in downtown. It is registered on the Kuyavian-Pomeranian Voivodeship Heritage List.

== Location ==
The building of is located in the south-western part of downtown Bydgoszcz, in the corner of Świętej Trójcy and Kruszwica streets. The edifice has been standing for a long time nearby the old Bydgoszcz Canal, until its burying in 1971–1973, replaced by the large Grunwaldska roundabout.

== History ==
=== Prussian Period (1908-1920) ===
The construction of the building is associated with lengthy efforts of city authorities to create a technical high school of fine arts in Bromberg. Already in 1872, William I, Emperor of Prussia, laid a cornerstone for the start of the construction of the school for art and industry (in today's Konarski street). The second half of the 19th century being a period of extraordinary growth Bydgoszcz, it soon dawned on people the need for modern education staff which could teach business, factory industry and craft workshops. The edifice at Konarski street quickly out of funds for its specialized equipment and teachers, and the building was converted to a high school for girls.

In November 1897, the Prussian Ministry of Trade and Crafts stated to be ready to participate in the cost of the establishment of schools by the state. In that direction, the building at Konarski street was dedicated in 1900 to courses for craftsmen. Eventually, in the early 1908, an agreement was signed to start the construction of a new school. The construction site allocated was bought by the municipality from a private owner for 43 000 German gold marks. Construction and design planning of the nearby area was paid by the government. Designers chosen for the building were the architects Otto Brech and Carl Meyer. Construction works began in 1910 in the then Berlin street (now Świętej Trójcy Street), and were completed one year later. The edifice has been designed on a grand scale and was standing in an attractive location, overlooking the Bydgoszcz Canal, as a showcase, in view of the headquarters of the artistic direction of Bromberg university.

The Royal-Prussian School of Craft and Art Industry (German: Königliche Preußische Handwerker- und Kunstgewerbeschule) was inaugurated on October 2, 1911; its first director being Berlin architect Arno Koernig. The school had four curriculums:

1. Architecture and decorative arts,
2. Decorative painting and graphics,
3. Sculpture,
4. Weaving and embroidery art.

At the time, It was the only state art school in the Province of Posen. In 1916 it was renamed Academy of Arts and Crafts and was part of the higher study cycle of the university, as were the two Music Schools. The academy has survived unchanged in Bydgoszcz till 1920.

=== Interwar period (1920-1939) ===
After Bydgoszcz was reunited with the revived Polish state in 1920, the school was renamed National School of Arts and Crafts, with the same curriculums. The director of the facility was the architect Kazimierz Ulatowski. Professors were recruited among the artists, from other regions of Poland, and from abroad. Thus came to Bydgoszcz:

- painters Jerzy Rupniewski, Bolesław Lewańsk;
- sculptors, painters and medalists Bronisław Bartel, Jan Wysocki and Feliks Giecewicz (who both had Piotr Triebler and Teodor Gajewski as students);
- graphic designers Karol Mondral, Piotr Chmura, Leon Dołżycki (who had Franciszek Gajewski as student);
- graphic artist Antoni Procajłowicz.

They were at that time the most prominent representatives of various artistic trends. University of Bydgoszcz was one of only four universities in the country with such a profile. The school diffused its artistic notoriousness to the entire Greater Poland and Pomerania. On September 1, 1921, on the initiative of the faculty, has been established the local branch of the Society for the Encouragement of Fine Arts (Polish: Towarzystwo Zachęty Sztuk Pięknych).

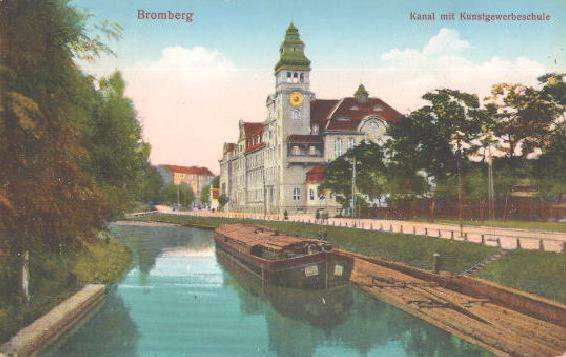
The school in 1908 at its inception, with the Bydgoszcz canal

The state authorities, contrary to city initiative, decided that in times of reconstruction of the country, the nation needed more artisans than artists: consequently, Art school closed down and in its place was established in 1923-1924 the National School of Industry. Director of the new school was engineer Franciszek Siemiradzki, the school having two divisions:

- Technical;
- Arts and crafts, for carpenters and locksmiths.

A year later three other departments opened:

- Agricultural industries, for trained farmers;
- Graphics industry;
- Craft industry.

Between 1926 and 1931, the building also housed a Civil Aviation Mechanics School (Polish: Cywilna Szkoła Mechaników Lotnictwa).

After a reorganization in 1931, the school consisted of two departments:Chemistry industry and Mill industry. It was the only institution in Poland educating professionals in this latter field. The average attendance was about 400 students, with a low below 300 students during the Great Depression. Pupils were coming in majority from outside Bydgoszcz, it is only in recent years that city students are more numerous. Therefore, in the 1930s, the school had its own dormitory at 11 Nowodworska in the Szwederowo district until 1935, .

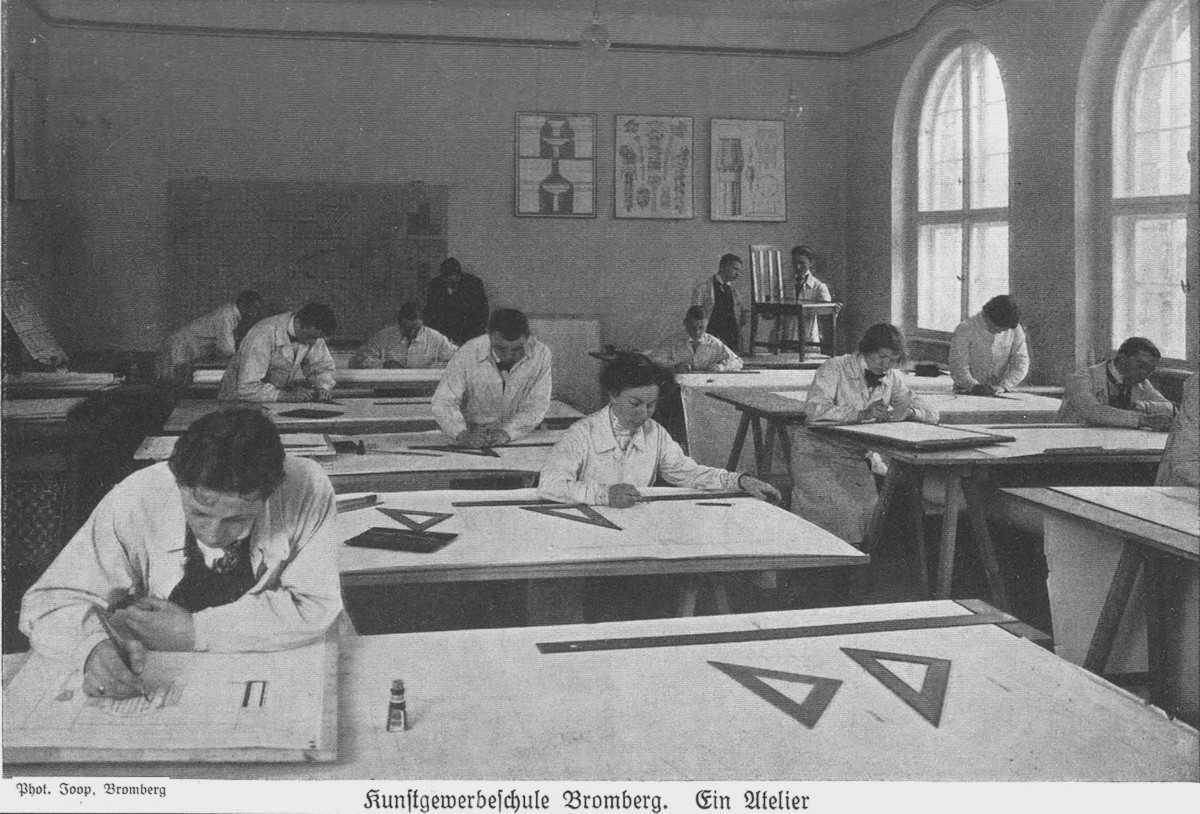
Workshop at "Royal-Prussian School of Craft and Art Industry", 1913 Bydgoszcz

The Industrial School was soon famous for the quality of its organization of teaching, educational work and up-to-date technical equipment. In 1932 it had 11 classrooms, a reading room, a library school (with more than 2 000 books) as well as offices and laboratories such as:

- chemical,
- technical analysis,
- research mill,
- chemical and physical lab printing,
- photochemistry,
- workshop for work with Hydrogen sulfide.

In addition, several new areas have been opened, like:

- mill experimental workshop,
- carpentry,
- locksmith,
- mechanics with, 20 different machine tools,
- acetylene welding. During Interwar period two thousand students were graduated.

=== Second World War ===
During German occupation, the building have been used as police headquarters.

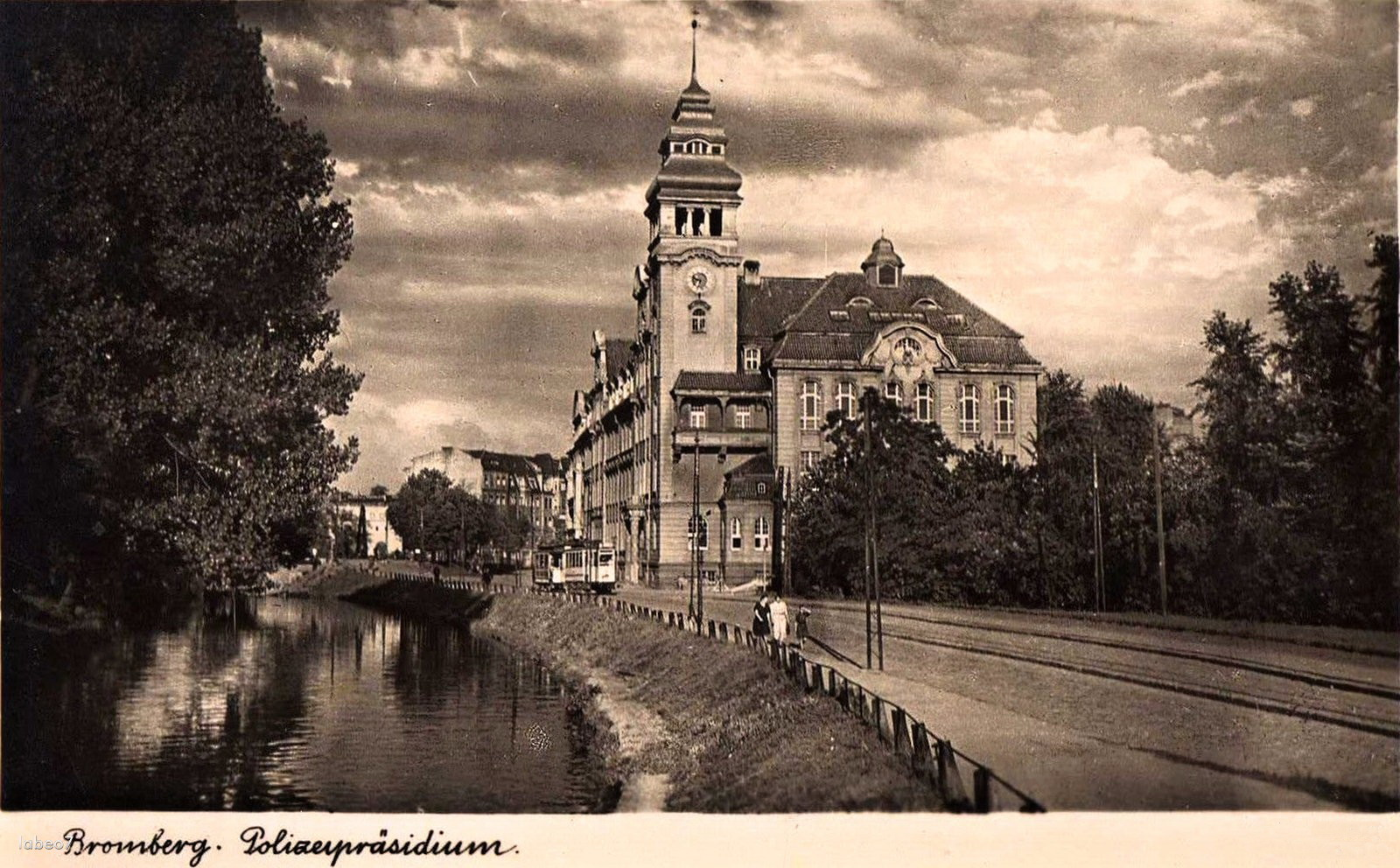
View of the building in 1941, housing German Police HQ

=== Period since 1945 ===
After the liberation of the city in January 1945, the school welcomed back its pre-war director, Franciszek Siemiradzki. In September 1945, the new school year of the State Technical School saw the opening of a gymnasium for mechanical, electrical and chemical studies. Then, as during interwar, and following the need of the reviving industry and the growing economy, the establishment opened several curriculums, like, among others:

- chemical and gas industry,
- radio, television, electronic,
- aviation rigging,
- aircraft construction and operation,
- inland waterways.

From 1951 to 1975, its name changed to School of Mechanics and Electrical Engineering to Mechanical School Nr.1. It initiated contacts with larger plants and industrial firms in the region for pupils in study or post-graduation.

In 1989, the institution received as a patron name Franciszek Siemiradzki, as one of the longest director on-post of the school history. Today the establishment curriculums are technics, mechanics, engineering, plastic processing and aviation equipment. Since 1945, the school graduated several thousands of students, who held high positions in local industry, or state and local administration. A dozen of them have been ministers, MPs and eminent scientists.

== Architecture ==
The building displays eclectic style, with a predominance for Neo-Baroque forms.

The edifice is brick-made and plastered. It comprised a basement and three-storey, covered with by a Mansard roof. Two avant-corps are part of the elevation on Świętej Trójcy Street and Focha street. Both are pedimented with curved shapes, the baroque way. Pediments are adorned with many architectural details: ox-eye windows, vegetal motifs, reliefs of garlands, urn and many other forms. The mansard roof displays shed and eyebrow dormers.

The main entrance features a portal, flanked with two columns and topped by a heavy balcony. The most famous element of the ensemble is the corner tower: its height overlooks the area. This square tower bears a clock, topped by a columned part, crowned by a metal tented roof.

The western frontage on Kruszwicka street is more eclectic. Between the tower and the facade, one can notice a loggia at mid-height with wooden elements are beautiful corbels underneath. One can also underline a small apse edifice on the ground floor, wedged between the tower and the main frontage. Further down Kruszwicka stand several lower dependences, also part of the school.

The edifice has been registered on the Kuyavian-Pomeranian Voivodeship Heritage List Nr.601424 Reg. A/890, on March 23, 1993.

== Gallery ==
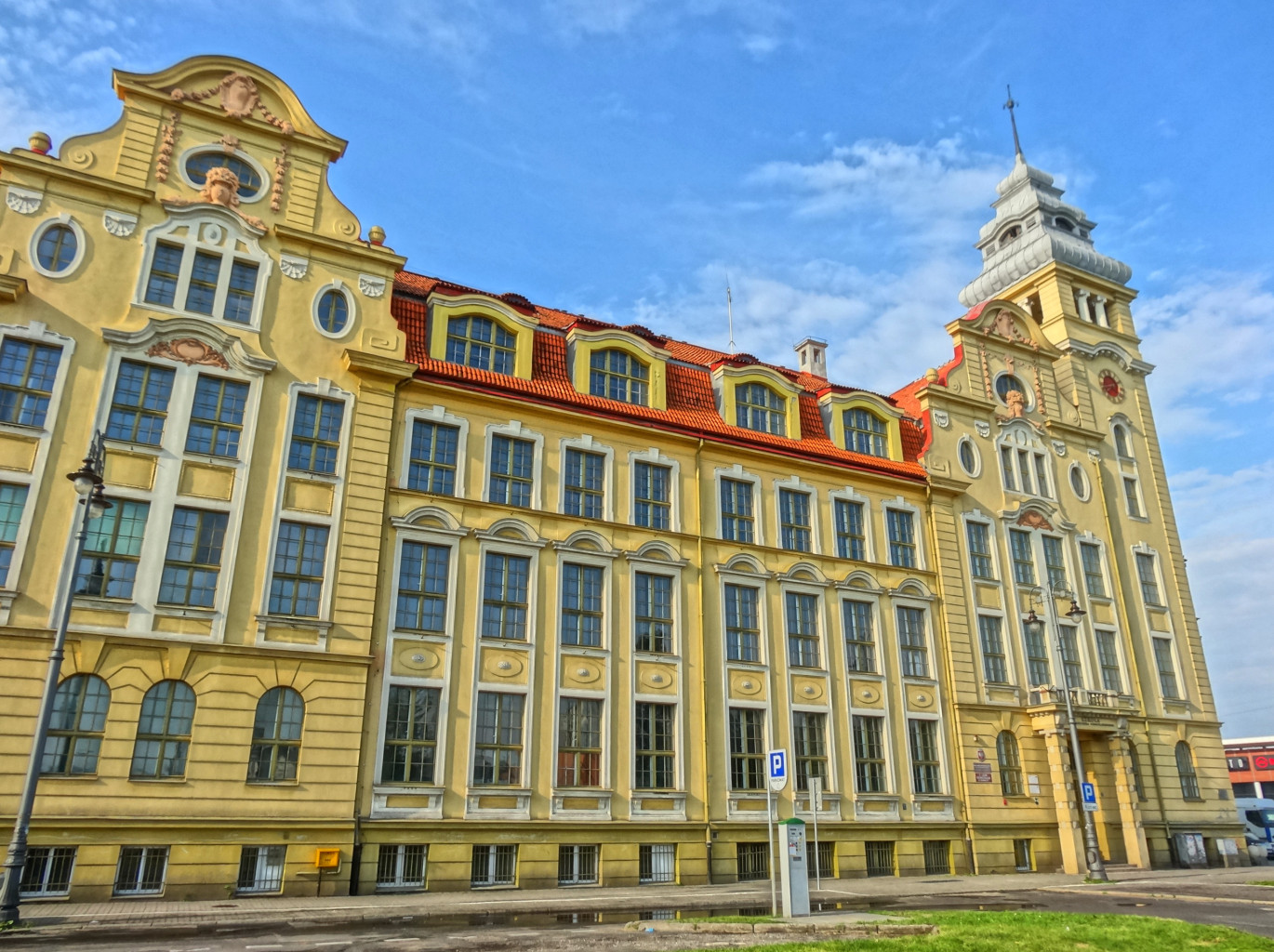
Elevation on Focha street

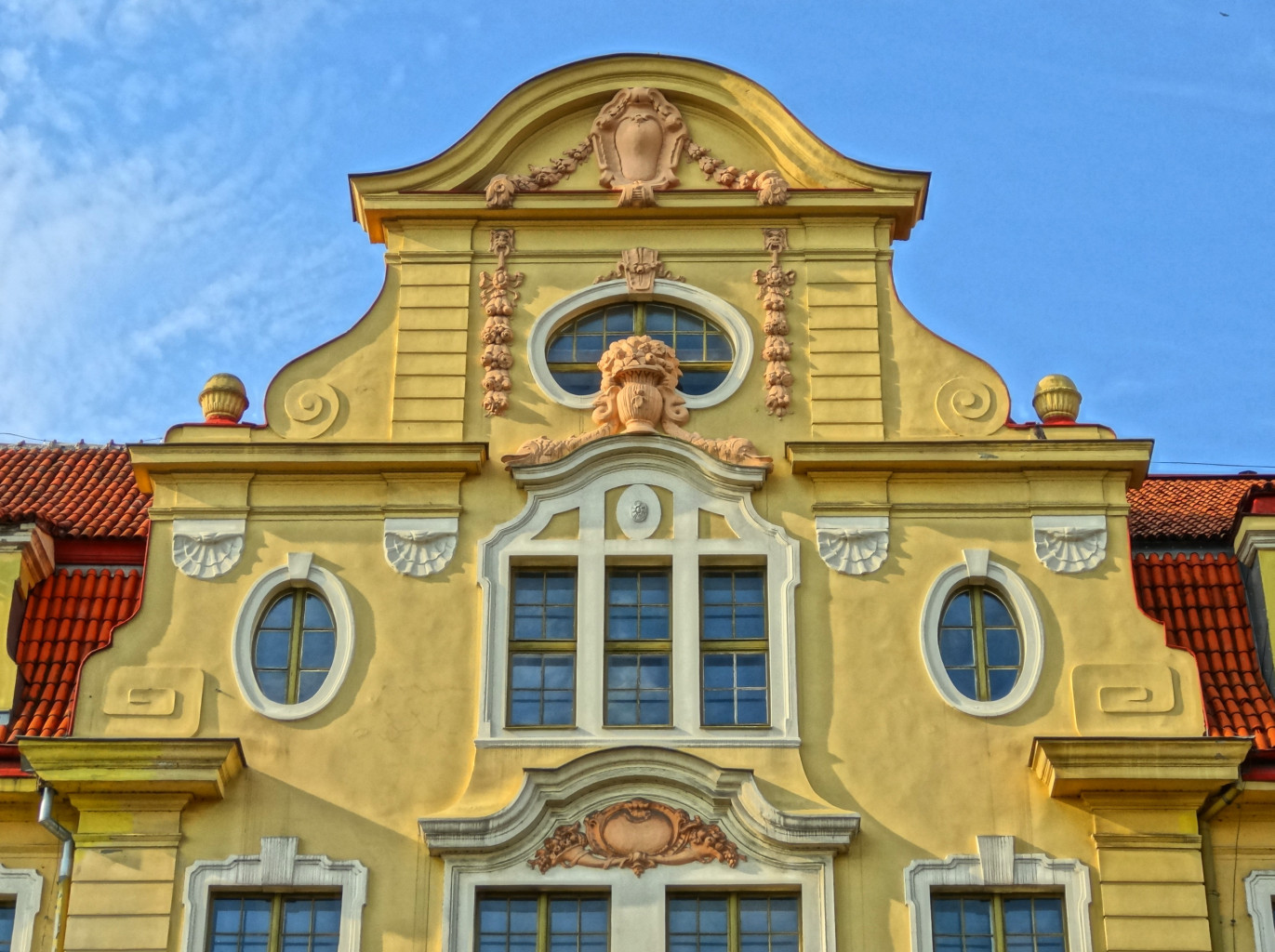
Detail of the pediment decoration

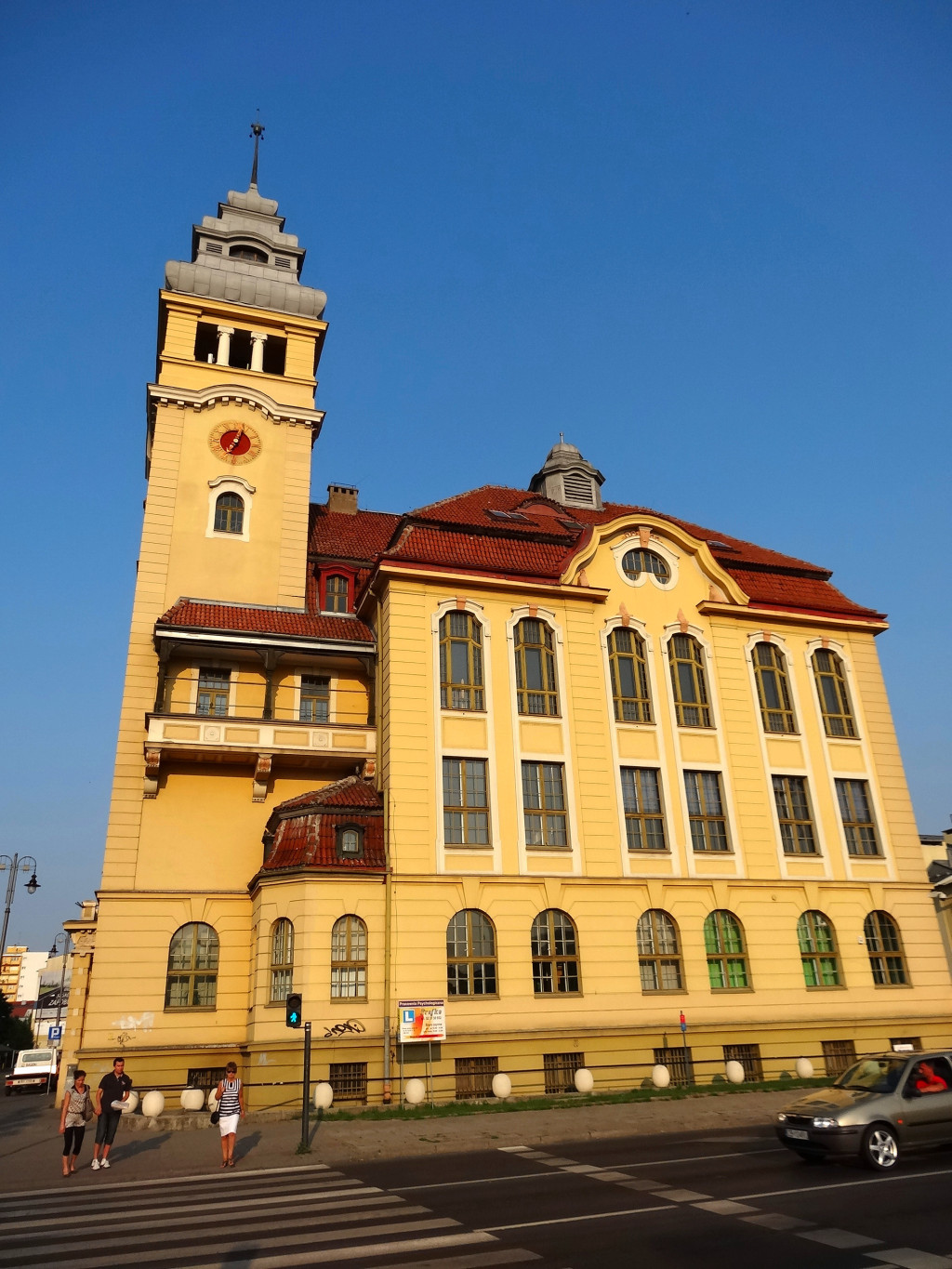
Frontage on Kruszwicka street

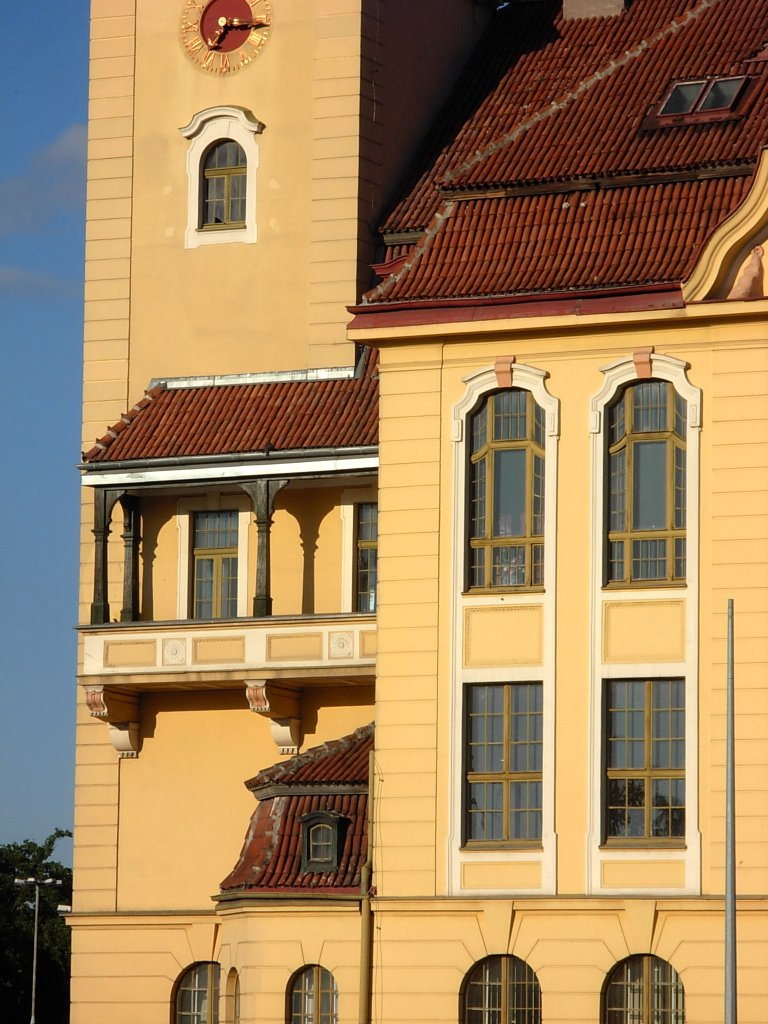
Detail of the loggia and the apse

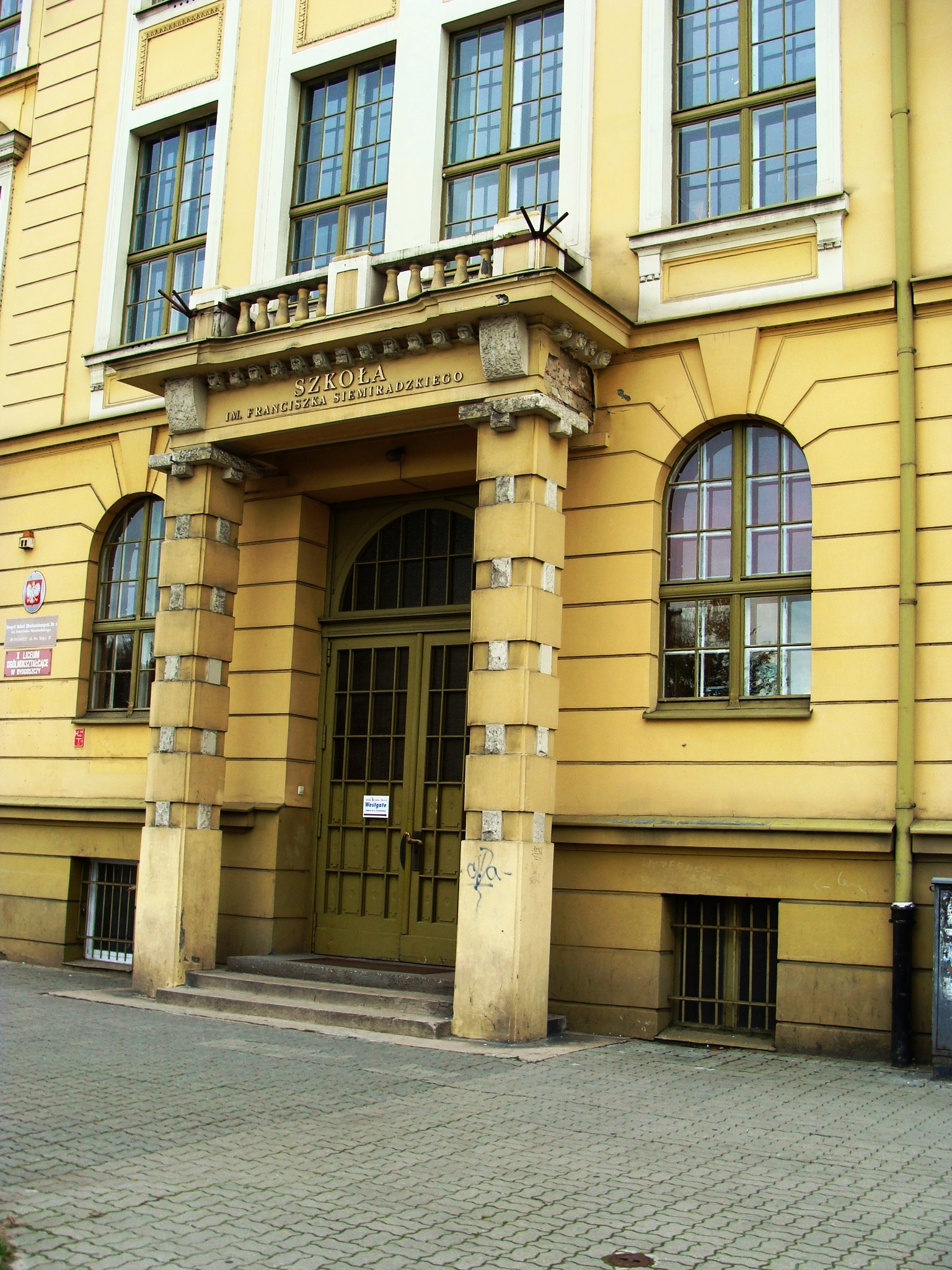
Main entry gate

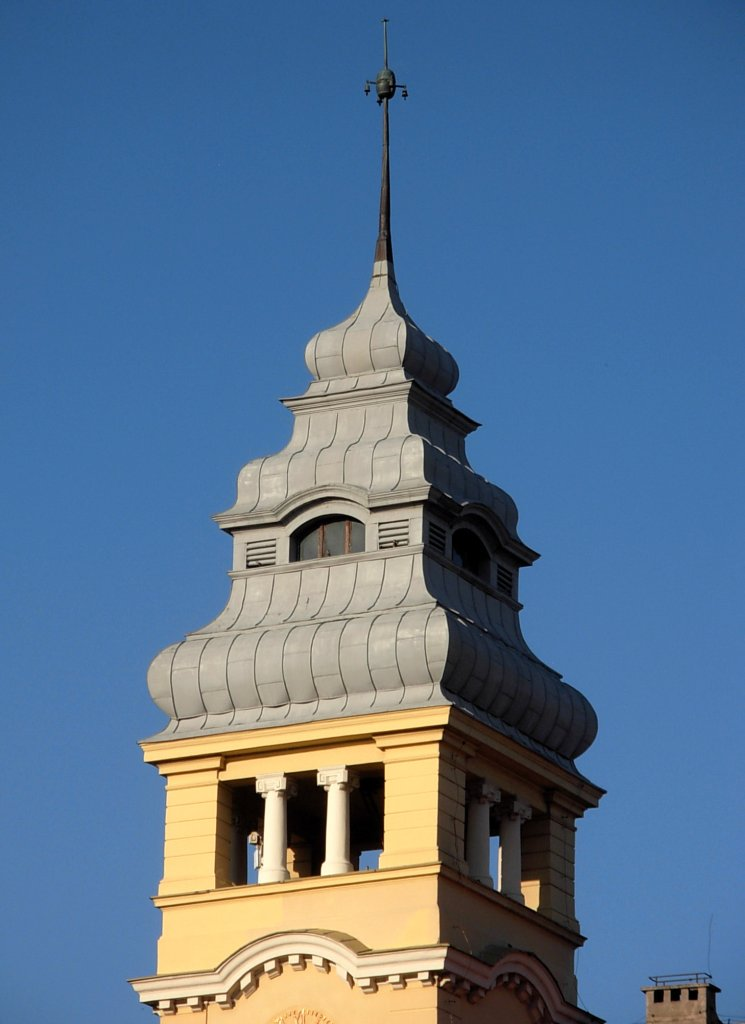
Metal tented roof of the tower

== See also ==
- Bydgoszcz
- Swiętej Trojcy street in Bydgoszcz
- Marshal Ferdinand Foch Street in Bydgoszcz
- Nakielska street in Bydgoszcz
- Mill Island in Bydgoszcz

== Bibliography ==
- (in Polish) Jeleniewski, Marek (2002). Jubileusz "Mechanika". Kalendarz Bydgoski. Bydgoszcz: Towarzystwo Miłośników Miasta Bydgoszczy.
- (in Polish) Parucka, Krystyna (2008). Zabytki Bydgoszczy – minikatalog. Bydgoszcz: „Tifen” Krystyna Parucka. ISBN 9788392719106.
- (in Polish) Umiński, Janusz (1996). Bydgoszcz. Przewodnik. Bydgoszcz: Regionalny Oddział PTTK „Szlak Brdy”.
- Jeleniewski, Marek (12 April 2015). "Bydgoski "Mechanik" ma 105 lat". express.bydgoski.pl (in Polish).
