= Jan Kauzik =

Polish painter (1860–1930)

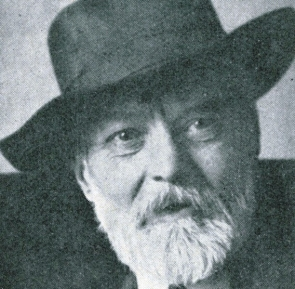
Jan Kauzik

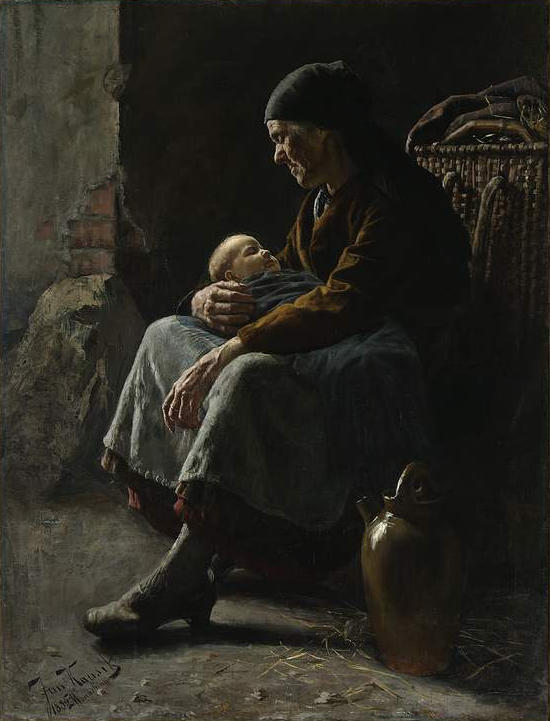
Grandma's Treasure

Jan Kazimierz Kauzik (8 February 1860, Warsaw - 18 September 1930, Warsaw) was a Polish painter and art teacher.

== Life and works ==
From 1875 to 1881, he studied at the Warsaw Drawing School (now the Academy of Fine Arts in Warsaw) with Wojciech Gerson and Aleksander Kamiński. He was presented with a cash prize for his works and a stipendium to study at the Society for the Encouragement of Fine Arts. From 1882 to 1885, he studied with Alexander von Wagner at the Academy of Fine Arts, Munich.

After returning to Warsaw, he became a Professor at the drawing school. From 1903, he also lectured at the Museum of Industry and Agriculture. From 1907 to 1908, he served as a museum custodian.

His style and content tended to be conservative; focusing on portraits, genre scenes and landscapes. From 1883 to 1909, he held numerous exhibits at his alma mater, the Society, and at the Kraków Society of Friends of Fine Arts.

In 1888, he married Stanisławą Leontyną Jezierską (1871-1947). They had four children; Janinę (1889-1949), Stanisław (1891-1959), who became a noted lawyer and politician, Eugeniusza (1892-1944) and Leokadię (1895-1944).

He was buried in the family tomb at the Powązki Cemetery.
